= 1989 British Formula 3000 Championship Rd.2 =

Layout of the Thruxton Circuit Grand Prix Circuit (1968–present)

The 2nd round of the inaugural British Formula 3000 Championship, saw the series arrive in Hampshire, for a race at the Thruxton Circuit, on 27 March.

== Report ==
=== Entry ===
A total of 10 F3000 cars were entered for this, the second round of the 1989 British F3000 Championship. Come raceday only nine would start the race.

=== Qualifying ===
Andrew Gilbert-Scott took pole position for Eddie Jordan Racing team in their Cosworth-engined Reynard 88D.

=== Race ===
The race was held over 40 laps of the fast Thruxton circuit. Gary Brabham took the winner spoils for the Bromley Motorsport team, driving their Reynard-Cosworth 88D. The Aussie won in a time of 44:01.83mins., averaging a speed of 128.434 mph. Second place went to Roland Ratzenberger in Spirit Motorsport’s Reynard-Cosworth 88D, who was just 1.90ecs behind. Poleman and winner of the first-ever British F3000 race, Andrew Gilbert-Scott completed the podium for the Eddie Jordan Racing in his Cosworth engined Reynard 88D, albeit one lap down.

== Classification ==
=== Race ===
Class winners in bold

Pos.	No.	Driver	Entrant	Car - Engine	Time, Laps	Reason Out
1st	**5**	(Australia) **Gary Brabham**	**Bromley Motorsport**	**Reynard-Cosworth 88D**	**44:01.83**	
2nd	16	(Austria) Roland Ratzenberger	Spirit Motorsport	Reynard-Cosworth 88D	44:03.73	
3rd	3	(United Kingdom) Andrew Gilbert-Scott	Eddie Jordan Racing	Reynard-Cosworth 88D	40	
4th	12	(Spain) Antonio Albacete	Madgwick Motorsport	Reynard-Cosworth 88D	39	
5th	9	(Portugal) Pedro Chaves	CoBRa Motorsport	Reynard-Cosworth 88D	38	
6th	4	(United Kingdom) Tony Trimmer	Tony Trimmer	March-Cosworth 88B	38	
NC	8	(United Kingdom) Richard Peacock	Source Racing	Lola-Cosworth T88/50	35	Running, not classified
NC	6	(United Kingdom) Roger Orgee	R.O./Omegaland	Reynard-Cosworth 88D	28	Running, not classified
DNF	2	(Brazil) Marco Greco	Eddie Jordan Racing	Reynard-Cosworth 88D	2	Suspension
DNS	7	(Netherlands) Cor Euser	Chamberlain	Reynard-Cosworth 88D		Accident in practice

- Fastest lap: Roland Ratzenberger, 1:04.44secs. (131.564 mph)
