= 1989 British Formula 3000 Championship Rd.7 =

The 7th round of the inaugural British Formula 3000 Championship, saw the series visit Silverstone, on 30 July.

== Report ==
=== Entry ===
A total of 9 F3000 cars were entered for this, the seventh round of the 1989 British F3000 Championship.

=== Qualifying ===
Gary Brabham took pole position for Bromley Motorsport team in their Cosworth-engined Reynard 88D. He was joined on the front row by Roland Ratzenberger in a similar Reynard, prepared by Spirit Motorsport.

=== Race ===
The race was held over 40 laps of the Silverstone National circuit. Gary Brabham took the winner spoils for the Bromley Motorsport team, driving their Reynard-Cosworth 88D. The Aussie won in a time of 42:32.21mins., averaging a speed of 107.907 mph. Second place went to championship leader, Andrew Gilbert-Scott in Eddie Jordan Racing’s Reynard-Cosworth 88D, who was only 0.58secs behind. Brabham’s victory moved him to within four points of Gilbert-Scott points leader, with just two rounds to go. Third was poleman, Roland Ratzenberger who completed the podium for the Spirit Motorsport owned by Geoff Mitchell and Tony Searles this Cosworth engined Reynard 88D.

== Classification ==
=== Race ===
Class winners in bold

Pos.	No.	Driver	Entrant	Car - Engine	Time, Laps	Reason Out
1st	**5**	(Australia) **Gary Brabham**	**Bromley Motorsport**	**Reynard-Cosworth 88D**	**42:32.21**	
2nd	3	(United Kingdom) Andrew Gilbert-Scott	Eddie Jordan Racing	Reynard-Cosworth 88D	42:32.79	
3rd	16	(Austria) Roland Ratzenberger	Spirit Motorsport	Reynard-Cosworth 88D	40	
4th	2	(Brazil) Marco Greco	Eddie Jordan Racing	Reynard-Cosworth 88D	40	
5th	10	(United Kingdom) Jonathan Bancroft	GA Motorsport	Lola-Cosworth T88/80	39	
6th	7	(United Kingdom) Tony Worswick	Tony Worswick	Reynard-Cosworth 88D	38	
7th	6	(United Kingdom) Roger Orgee	R.O./Omegaland	Reynard-Cosworth 88D	38	
8th	8	(Spain) Felipe Machado	Madgwick Motorsport	Reynard-Cosworth 88D	37	
DNS	12	(Spain) Antonio Albacete	Madgwick Motorsport	Reynard-Cosworth 88D		engine

- Fastest lap: Roland Ratzenberger, 1:02.91secs. (109.299 mph)
