= 1989 British Formula 3000 Championship Rd.5 =

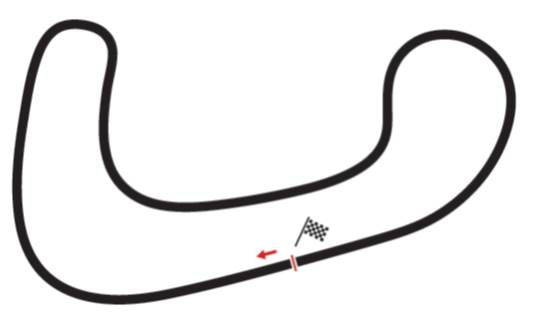
Layout of the Brands Hatch Indy Circuit (1976–1998)

The 5th round of the inaugural British Formula 3000 Championship, saw the series arrive back in Kent, for their second visit of the year to Brands Hatch, on 25 June.

== Report ==
=== Entry ===
A total of 12 F3000 cars were entered for this, the fifth round of the 1989 British F3000 Championship.

=== Qualifying ===
Roland Ratzenberger took pole position for Spirit Motorsport team in their Cosworth-engined Reynard 88D. He was joined on the front row by Gary Brabham in a similar Reynard, prepared by Bromley Motorsport.

=== Race ===
The race was held over 60 laps of the Brands Hatch Indy circuit. Gary Brabham took the winner spoils for the Bromley Motorsport team, driving their Reynard-Cosworth 88D. The Aussie won in a time of 40:38.73mins., averaging a speed of 106.729 mph. Second place went to poleman, Roland Ratzenberger in Spirit Motorsport's Reynard-Cosworth 88D, who was just 2.75secs behind. Third was Grand Prix Motorcycle road racer, Marco Greco completed the podium for the Eddie Jordan Racing in his Cosworth engined Reynard 88D, while former F1 driver, Desiré Wilson made an appearance for GA Motorsport in their Lola T88/50, finishing fourth.

== Classification ==
=== Race ===
Class winners in bold

Pos.	No.	Driver	Entrant	Car - Engine	Time, Laps	Reason Out
1st	**5**	(Australia) **Gary Brabham**	**Bromley Motorsport**	**Reynard-Cosworth 88D**	**40:38.73**	
2nd	16	(Austria) Roland Ratzenberger	Spirit Motorsport	Reynard-Cosworth 88D	40:41.48	
3rd	2	(Brazil) Marco Greco	Eddie Jordan Racing	Reynard-Cosworth 88D	60	
4th	11	(South Africa) Desiré Wilson	GA Motorsport	Lola-Cosworth T88/50	59	
5th	4	(United Kingdom) Tony Trimmer	Tony Trimmer	March-Cosworth 88B	58	
6th	9	(United Kingdom) Damon Hill	CoBRa Motorsport	Reynard-Cosworth 88D	57	
7th	7	(United Kingdom) Tony Worswick	Tony Worswick	Reynard-Cosworth 88D	56	
8th	8	(Canada) Peter Bourque	CoBRa Motorsport	Reynard-Cosworth 88D	56	
NC	6	(United Kingdom) Roger Orgee	R.O./Omegaland	Reynard-Cosworth 88D	53	Running, not classified
DNF	3	(United Kingdom) Andrew Gilbert-Scott	Eddie Jordan Racing	Reynard-Cosworth 88D	50	
DNF	12	(Spain) Antonio Albacete	Madgwick Motorsport	Reynard-Cosworth 88D	22	
DNF	10	(United Kingdom) Jonthan Bancroft	GA Motorsport	Lola-Cosworth T88/80	3	

- Fastest lap: Gary Brabham, 39.90secs. (109.173 mph)
