= 1989 British Formula 3000 Championship =

Seasons
- ← none 1990 →

The 1989 British Formula 3000 Championship was the first season of the British Formula 3000 Championship. Australia’s Gary Brabham took the inaugural title, racing an ex-Jean Alesi Reynard-Cosworth 88D for Bromley Motorsport. He took three race wins during the season. Brabham, son of three time World Drivers Champion, Jack Brabham, only raced in the series after a deal to race for Roni Q8 Racing in the International F3000 series fell through.

Andrew Gilbert-Scott finished second overall for Eddie Jordan Racing, like Brabham, winning three races, in his Reynard-Cosworth 88D. Third spot in the standing went to Roland Ratzenberger, taking victory in round 4, at Donington Park. Other entrants during the season included Damon Hill for CoBRa Motorsports. He drove in two races, finishing third in round 3 at Oulton Park and 6th in round 5, at Brands Hatch, also in a 88D. CoBRa did taste victory in the final round, when Paolo Carcasci won at Oulton Park. Pedro Chaves, who would win the title in 1990, finished 12th in final standing after just one appearance, while former F1 driver, Desiré Wilson made an appearance for GA Motorsport in a Lola T88/50, finishing fourth, in round 5 at Brands Hatch.

== Drivers and teams ==
The following drivers and teams contested the 1989 British Formula 3000 Championship.

| Team | Chassis | Engine | No. | Driver | Rounds |
|---|---|---|---|---|---|
| (Republic of Ireland) Eddie Jordan Racing | Reynard | Cosworth | 2 | (Brazil) Marco Greco | All |
| (Republic of Ireland) Eddie Jordan Racing | Reynard | Cosworth | 3 | (United Kingdom) Andrew Gilbert-Scott | All |
| (United Kingdom) Tony Trimmer | March | Cosworth | 4 | (United Kingdom) Tony Trimmer | 1-6 |
| (United Kingdom) Bromley Motorsport | Reynard | Cosworth | 5 | (Australia) Gary Brabham | All |
| (United Kingdom) R.O./Omegaland | Reynard | Cosworth | 6 | (United Kingdom) Roger Orgee | 1, 2, 5, 7 |
| (United Kingdom) R.O./Omegaland | March | Cosworth | 6 | (United Kingdom) Mike Bryan | 9 |
| (United Kingdom) Chamberlain | Reynard | Cosworth | 7 | (United Kingdom) Ian Khan | 1 |
| (United Kingdom) Chamberlain | Reynard | Cosworth | 7 | (Netherlands) Cor Euser | 2 |
| (United Kingdom) Worswick Engineering | Reynard | Cosworth | 7 | (United Kingdom) Tony Worswick | 4-9 |
| (United Kingdom) Worswick Engineering | Reynard | Cosworth | 14 | (United Kingdom) Tony Worswick | 3 |
| (United Kingdom) CoBRa Motorsports | Reynard | Cosworth | 8 | (Canada) Peter Bourque | 5 |
| (United Kingdom) CoBRa Motorsports | Reynard | Cosworth | 9 | (Portugal) Pedro Chaves | 2 |
| (United Kingdom) CoBRa Motorsports | Reynard | Cosworth | 9 | (United Kingdom) Damon Hill | 3, 5 |
| (United Kingdom) CoBRa Motorsports | Reynard | Cosworth | 9 | (Canada) Peter Bourque | 7 |
| (United Kingdom) CoBRa Motorsports | Reynard | Cosworth | 9 | (Brazil) Paolo Carcasci | 8-9 |
| (United Kingdom) CoBRa Motorsports | Reynard | Cosworth | 15 | (United Kingdom) Ross Hockenhull | 8 |
| (United Kingdom) GA Motorsport | Lola | Cosworth | 10 | (United Kingdom) Jonathan Bancroft | 5-9 |
| (United Kingdom) GA Motorsport | Lola | Cosworth | 11 | (South Africa) Desiré Wilson | 5 |
| (United Kingdom) GA Motorsport | Lola | Cosworth | 11 | (United Kingdom) Daniel Muller | 8 |
| (United Kingdom) GA Motorsport | Lola | Cosworth | 11 | (United Kingdom) Perry McCarthy | 9 |
| (United Kingdom) GA Motorsport | Lola | Cosworth | 17 | (United Kingdom) Divina Galica | 1 |
| (United Kingdom) Mansell Madgwick Motorsport | Reynard | Cosworth | 11 | (Brazil) Paolo Carcasci | 4 |
| (United Kingdom) Mansell Madgwick Motorsport | Reynard | Cosworth | 11 | (Spain) Felipe Machado | 7-9 |
| (United Kingdom) Mansell Madgwick Motorsport | Reynard | Cosworth | 12 | (Spain) Antonio Albacete | All |
| (United Kingdom) Spirit Motorsport | Reynard | Cosworth | 16 | (Austria) Roland Ratzenberger | 1-8 |
| (United Kingdom) Geoff Farmer | Lola | Cosworth | 27 | (United Kingdom) Geoff Farmer | 1 |
| (United Kingdom) RCR 3000 | Lola | Cosworth | 37 | (Switzerland) Mario Hytten | 1 |
| (United Kingdom) RCR 3000 | Lola | Cosworth | 37 | (Austria) Pierre Chauvet | 9 |
| (United Kingdom) RCR 3000 | Lola | Cosworth | 39 | (Austria) Pierre Chauvet | 4, 5, 8 |
| (United Kingdom) RCR 3000 | Lola | Cosworth | 39 | (Italy) Dominco Gitto | 6 |

== Results ==
=== British Formula 3000 Championship ===
| Round | Date | Circuit | Pole position | Fastest lap | Winning driver | Winning team |
|---|---|---|---|---|---|---|
| 1 | March 19 | (United Kingdom) Brands Hatch (Indy) | (Brazil) Marco Greco | (Australia) Gary Brabham | (United Kingdom) Andrew Gilbert-Scott | Eddie Jordan Racing |
| 2 | March 27 | (United Kingdom) Thruxton | (United Kingdom) Andrew Gilbert-Scott | (Austria) Roland Ratzenberger | (Australia) Gary Brabham | Bromley Motorsport |
| 3 | April 15 | (United Kingdom) Oulton Park | (Australia) Gary Brabham | (Australia) Gary Brabham | (United Kingdom) Andrew Gilbert-Scott | Eddie Jordan Racing |
| 4 | May 29 | (United Kingdom) Donington Park | (Austria) Roland Ratzenberger | (Austria) Roland Ratzenberger | (Austria) Roland Ratzenberger | Spirit Motorsport |
| 5 | June 25 | (United Kingdom) Brands Hatch (Indy) | (Austria) Roland Ratzenberger | (Australia) Gary Brabham | (Australia) Gary Brabham | Bromley Motorsport |
| 6 | July 2 | (United Kingdom) Snetterton | (United Kingdom) Andrew Gilbert-Scott | (United Kingdom) Andrew Gilbert-Scott | (United Kingdom) Andrew Gilbert-Scott | Eddie Jordan Racing |
| 7 | July 30 | (United Kingdom) Silverstone (National) | (Australia) Gary Brabham | (Austria) Roland Ratzenberger | (Australia) Gary Brabham | Bromley Motorsport |
| 8 | August 13 | (United Kingdom) Oulton Park | (Austria) Roland Ratzenberger | (Austria) Roland Ratzenberger | (Brazil) Paolo Carcasci | CoBRa Motorsport |
| 9 | September 10 | (United Kingdom) Brands Hatch (GP) | (United Kingdom) Andrew Gilbert-Scott | (Australia) Gary Brabham | (Australia) Gary Brabham | Bromley Motorsport |

== Championship Standings ==
| Pos. | Driver | BHI | THR | OUL | DON | BHI | SNE | SIL | OUL | BGP | Points |
|---|---|---|---|---|---|---|---|---|---|---|---|
| 1 | (Australia) Gary Brabham | 3 | 1 | 2 | 6 | 1 | 5 | 1 | 2 | 1 | 55 |
| 2 | (United Kingdom) Andrew Gilbert-Scott | 1 | 3 | 1 | 3 | Ret | 1 | 2 | 3 | Ret | 45 |
| 3 | (Austria) Roland Ratzenberger | 2 | 2 | 8† | 1 | 2 | 2 | 3 | Ret | | 37 |
| 4 | (Brazil) Marco Greco | Ret | Ret | 6 | 2 | 3 | 3 | 4 | DNS | 3 | 22 |
| 5 | (Brazil) Paolo Carcasci | | | | 4 | | | | 1 | 6 | 13 |
| 6 | (Spain) Antonio Albacete | NC | 4 | 4 | Ret | Ret | 4 | DNS | Ret | 7 | 9 |
| 7 | (United Kingdom) Tony Trimmer | 4 | 6 | 5 | Ret | 5 | 7 | | | | 8 |
| 8 | (United Kingdom) Perry McCarthy | | | | | | | | | 2 | 6 |
| 9 | (United Kingdom) Tony Worswick | | | 7 | 5 | 7 | DNS | 6 | 4 | 9 | 6 |
| 10 | (United Kingdom) Jonathan Bancroft | | | | | Ret | 6 | 5 | Ret | 4 | 6 |
| 11 | (United Kingdom) Damon Hill | | | 3 | | 6 | | | | | 5 |
| 12 | (South Africa) Desiré Wilson | | | | | 4 | | | | | 3 |
| 13 | (Austria) Pierre Chauvet | | | | Ret | | | | | 5 | 2 |
| 14 | (Switzerland) Mario Hytten | 5 | | | | | | | | | 2 |
| 15 | (Portugal) Pedro Chaves | | 5 | | | | | | | | 2 |
| 16 | (United Kingdom) Ian Khan | 6 | | | | | | | | | 1 |
| 17 | (United Kingdom) Roger Orgee | | NC | | | NC | | 7 | | | 0 |
| 18 | (United Kingdom) Ross Hockenhull | | | | | | | | 7 | | 0 |
| 19 | (Spain) Felipe Machado | | | | | | | 8 | Ret | 8 | 0 |
| 20 | (Canada) Peter Bourque | | | | | 8 | | | | | 0 |
| | (United Kingdom) Richard Peacock | | NC | | | | | | | | |
| | (United Kingdom) Geoff Farmer | Ret | | | | | | | | | |
| | (Italy) Dominico Gitto | | | | | | Ret | | | | |
| | (Netherlands) Cor Euser | | DNS | | | | | | | | |
| | (United Kingdom) Daniel Muller | | | | | | | | DNS | | |
| | (United Kingdom) Mike Bryan | | | | | | | | | DNS | |
