= 1989 British Formula 3000 Championship Rd.9 =

Layout of the Brands Hatch Grand Prix Circuit (1988–1998)

The 9th round of the inaugural British Formula 3000 Championship, saw the series return to Brands Hatch, on 10 September. Going into this, the final round, the championship was being led by Gary Brabham (46 pts.), separated by just one point from Andrew Gilbert-Scott (45 pts.)

== Report ==
=== Entry ===
A total of 11 F3000 cars were entered for this, the final round of the 1989 British F3000 Championship.

=== Qualifying ===
Andrew Gilbert-Scott took pole position for Eddie Jordan Racing team in their Cosworth-engined Reynard 88D. He was joined on the front row by championship leader, Gary Brabham in a similar Reynard, prepared by Bromley Motorsport.

=== Race ===
The race was held over 27 laps of the Brands Hatch Grand Prix circuit. The race was stopped on lap six, following an accident involving Andrew Gilbert-Scott. This effectively handed Gary Brabham the title. Brabham would go on and win the restarted race for the Bromley Motorsport team, driving their Reynard-Cosworth 88D. The Aussie won in a time of 35:09.83mins., averaging a speed of 119.782 mph. Second place went to Perry McCarthy in GA Motorsport's Lola-Cosworth T88/50, who was nearly 25secs behind. Third went to Marco Greco who completed the podium for Eddie Jordan Racing in his Cosworth engined Reynard 88D.

== Classification ==
=== Race ===
Class winners in bold

Pos.	No.	Driver	Entrant	Car - Engine	Time, Laps	Reason Out
1st	**5**	(Australia) **Gary Brabham**	**Bromley Motorsport**	**Reynard-Cosworth 88D**	**35:09.83**	
2nd	11	(United Kingdom) Perry McCarthy	GA Motorsport	Lola-Cosworth T88/50	35:34.58	
3rd	2	(Brazil) Marco Greco	Eddie Jordan Racing	Reynard-Cosworth 88D	27	
4th	10	(United Kingdom) Jonthan Bancroft	GA Motorsport	Lola-Cosworth T88/50	27	
5th	37	(Austria) ”Pierre Chauvet”	RCR 3000	Lola-Cosworth T88/50	27	
6th	9	(Brazil) Paolo Carcasci	CoBRa Motorsport	Reynard-Cosworth 88D	27 #	
7th	12	(Spain) Antonio Albacete	Madgwick Motorsport	Reynard-Cosworth 88D	27 #	
8th	8	(Spain) Felipe Machado	Madgwick Motorsport	Reynard-Cosworth 88D	26	
9th	7	(United Kingdom) Tony Worswick	Tony Worswick	Reynard-Cosworth 88D	26	
DNF	3	(United Kingdom) Andrew Gilbert-Scott	Eddie Jordan Racing	Reynard-Cosworth 88D	6	crash
DNS	6	(United Kingdom) Mike Bryan	R.O./Omegaland	Reynard-Cosworth 88D		accident in practice
# includes 60s penalty for jump-start

- Fastest lap: Gary Brabham, 1:16.04secs. (123.077 mph)
