= 1989 24 Hours of Le Mans =

57th 24 Hours of Le Mans endurance race

Previous: 1988	Next: 1990
Index: Races | Winners

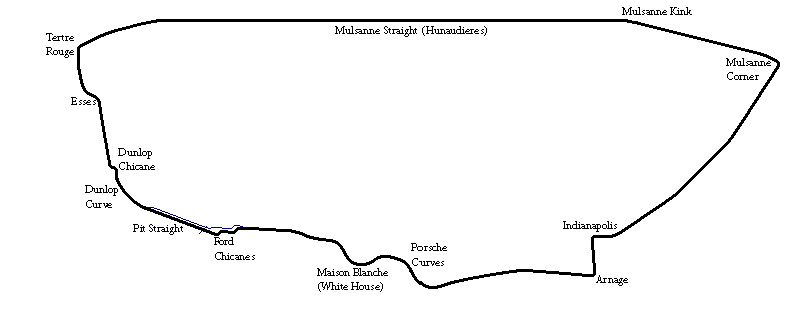
Le Mans in 1989

The 1989 24 Hours of Le Mans was the 57th Grand Prix of Endurance, taking place at the Circuit de la Sarthe, France, on the 10 and 11 June 1989. This year it was not included as a round of the 1989 World Sports-Prototype Championship. The entry list promised a strong contest between five manufacturers. Jaguar had won in 1988 and went on to win the championship; while Sauber had finished second and was now matching Jaguar on the track. New regulations were coming in 1991, and the first examples of the 3.5-litre normally-aspirated formula were entered by Spice Engineering.

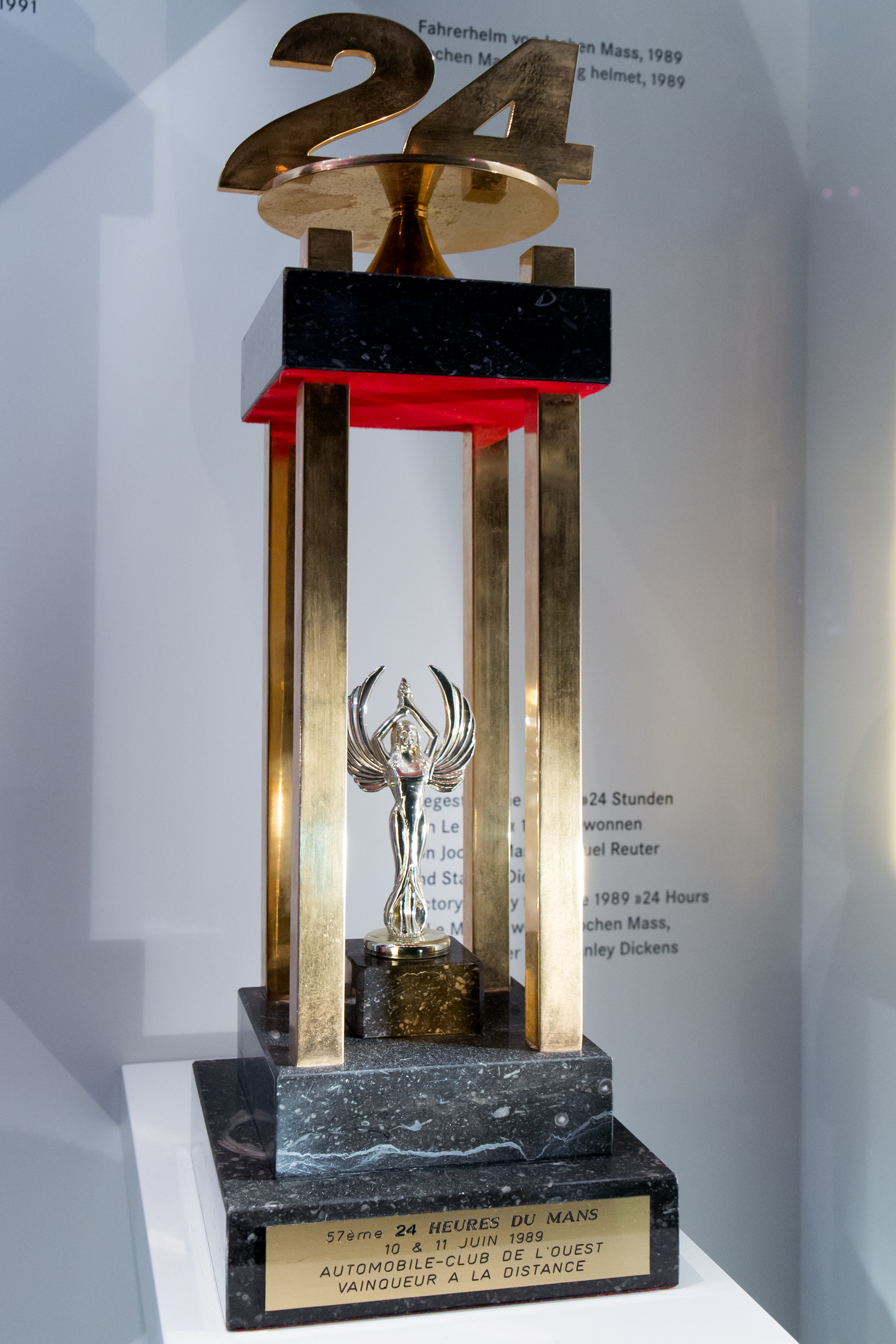
The 1989 Le Mans Winners' Trophy

Although the Saubers started on the front row, it was the Jaguar of Davy Jones that led for the first three hours until the car suddenly came to a stop on the back straight, dropping them well down the field. With the Saubers running to a designated race-pace, it was the Joest Porsche of Wollek and Stuck that took the lead, keeping it for six hours, and into the night. The Jaguar team kept having niggly problems that left them constantly playing catch-up. As night fell, against predictions it was the Joest Porsches running a 1-2. However, at 1.20am, Stuck brought his car in with overheating problems, losing the 3-lap lead they had built up. This moved the Lammers Jaguar to the front for the rest of the night, chased by two of the Saubers. The race was lost for Jaguar as dawn arrived, as their three remaining cars were waylaid. Two of them needed full gearbox changes. This left the Saubers racing each other for the lead on the same lap. However, when Baldi ran out of brakes and ended up in the Dunlop gravel-trap, Dickens went through to take a lead he would not relinquish. Baldi's Sauber lost its chance to fight back when the gearbox broke leaving co-driver Acheson to run home stuck in fifth gear. Third was the Wollek/Stuck Porsche, fighting clutch problems, seven laps behind the winners, with the best of the Jaguars – that of Lammers/Tambay/Gilbert-Scott – in fourth.

In the C2 class, it had been a race of attrition with every car suffering some kind of delay and only five of the fourteen starters finishing. In the end, the class win went to the Cougar of Philippe Farjon and Courage Compétition. Mazda again had the GTP class to themselves and, again, they were pleased to have all three cars finish – the best coming home seventh overall, 21 laps behind the winner. The event was also notable for the unusual number of cars having engine fires - with six of them afflicted either in practice or during the race. Despite the alarming spectacles that produced, the drivers were all able to stop and get out without suffering injury.

== Regulations ==
At the end of 1988, the FIA (Fédération Internationale de l'Automobile) announced an overhaul of the Group C regulations. From 1991, the fuel restrictions would be removed, and the cars would have a weight-limit of 750 kg and be powered by 3.5-litre non-turbo engines. The formula was proposed by Bernie Ecclestone, the FIA officer in charge of promotion. These engines were coming into Formula 1 this year, and it was an undisguised attempt to bring the major Sports Car manufacturers (Porsche, Jaguar, Mercedes-Benz, Toyota, Nissan, Mazda) into that series at a reduced cost of two series for one engine. Races would be 350 km (with co-drivers optional), aside from the only endurance race in the schedule- at Le Mans.

At a stroke, Group C would be consigned to history, with 1989 and 1990 now designated as transitional seasons to allow the new models to be phased in. Group C2 would be ended at the close of this year. Group C cars would still run to the fuel restrictions, with an additional 50 kg of minimum weight added and manual control of the turbo-boost now banned. In contrast, the new 3.5-litre engines were not under these restrictions. This year's championship would be 9 rounds, with teams required to enter every round or face a US$250,000 fine per race missed. The only exception was for Japanese teams who could miss one European round. The ACO (Automobile Club de l'Ouest) was allowed to take entries from non-Championship cars if the number of official entries was less than 50. Ecclestone also stated that the FIA had control over TV rights and had also signed contracts for race-timing with Longines and Olivetti.

All of these were at odds with the contracts the ACO already had in place. When it was still unresolved by May, the ACO had no option but to withdraw the race from the World Championship. This did not go down well with many teams – particularly from Japan – who had committed to the costly full season to be able to compete at Le Mans, which they could now do anyway. This year, the ACO modified the formula for the Indice Energétique, to become the Challenge Econergie.

== Entries ==
Despite the FIA regulations, the entry-list was one of the strongest of the Group C era, with five different manufacturers now with genuine race-winning aspirations. There were 25 factory cars – with the notable exception of Porsche. However, it was supporting a flotilla of 17 customer entries, easily the strongest marque present. Joining them this year was Aston Martin, late to the party, and Spice, who were the first to introduce a design to the new 3.5-litre specifications. The C2 class of 18 was dominated by Spice, with 8 entries reflecting its current dominance in racing series around the world. Once again, Mazda entered its cars in the IMSA-GTP class, and again the three of them had the class to themselves. For the first time since 1982 (the inaugural year of the Group C era), a full grid of 55 cars took the start.

Class	Quantity	Turbo+Rotary engines
Group C1	41 / 38	33 / 30
IMSA-GTP	3 / 3	3 / 3
Group C2	18 / 14	2 / 2
Total Entries	62 / 55	38 / 35

- Note: The first number is the number accepted, the second the number who started.

=== Group C1 ===
In 1988, Jaguar had achieved their goal to win Le Mans again, and then won the World Championship for the second consecutive year. They were also running a full programme in the IMSA series. This year, under new TWR Technical Director Ross Brawn, they were moving quickly to prepare the new twin-turbo V6 car (called the XJR-10 for IMSA and XJR-11 for Group C). Meanwhile, four of last year's XJR-9 were prepared for Le Mans instead. With further refinement from TWR's engine-specialist, Allan Scott, they were able to reach 390 kp/ h (240 mph). They were also now fitted with 18" tyres. Race winner Jan Lammers was now paired with former Ferrari F1 driver Patrick Tambay. They were joined for this race by British F3000 driver Andrew Gilbert-Scott. The other championship duo was John Nielsen and Andy Wallace, with Price Cobb (Nielsen's co-driver in the IMSA series). Together, these three had finished second in the Daytona 24-hours. The third car had Americans Davy Jones and Jeff Kline, with Derek Daly; while the fourth had the Ferté brothers, Alain and Michel, racing with Chilean Eliseo Salazar.

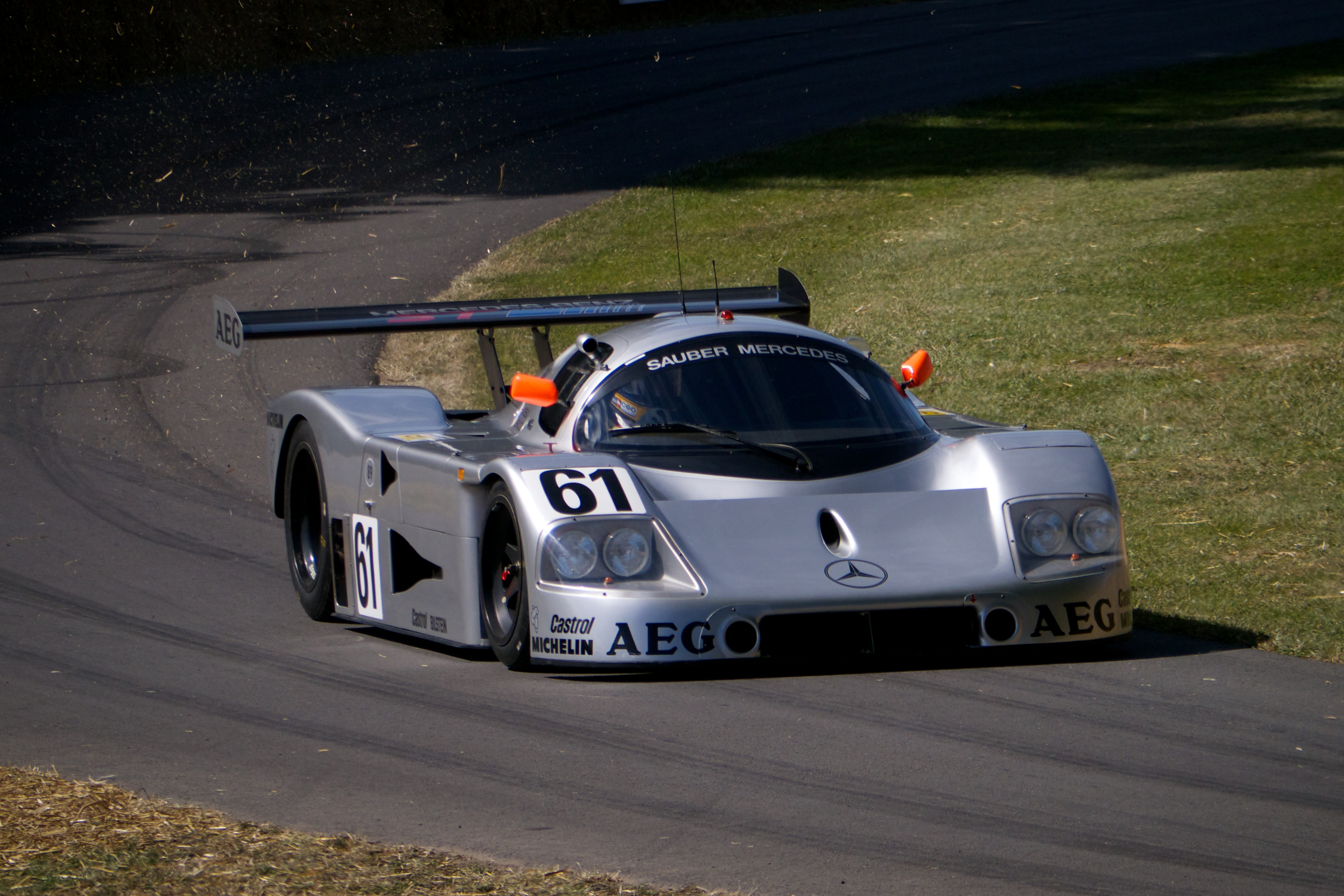
Sauber C9

After withdrawing from the event last year, the Sauber Mercedes-Benz had gone on to better things. Finishing second in the Championship to Jaguar, they had then started this year with a win at Suzuka. The C9 had received a number of aero refinements. Hermann Hiereth and his team at Mercedes-Benz developed the new 5.0-litre twin-turbo V8 M119 engine: now a double overhead cam design with four valves per cylinder, it had improved power and fuel efficiency and could put out 720 bhp. After the tyre failures the previous year, Michelin had done extensive high-speed testing to supply reliable rubber to the team, although their cornering performance still left a bit to be desired. The team's main concern was whether the Hewland transmission would withstand the extreme torque put through it for 24 hours. Mercedes sports director Jochen Neerpasch brought 86 works personnel to support Sauber team manager Dave Price with the three cars, now decked out with the 3-pointed star and silver livery of Mercedes to emphasise the closer bond. This year, lead driver Jean-Louis Schlesser came to the race, with fellow Frenchmen Alain Cudini and former Matra and Renault driver Jean-Pierre Jabouille. Schlesser's co-driver at Suzuka, Mauro Baldi raced with Kenny Acheson and Gianfranco Brancatelli, while the other works driver, Jochen Mass had Manuel Reuter and Swede Stanley Dickens with him.

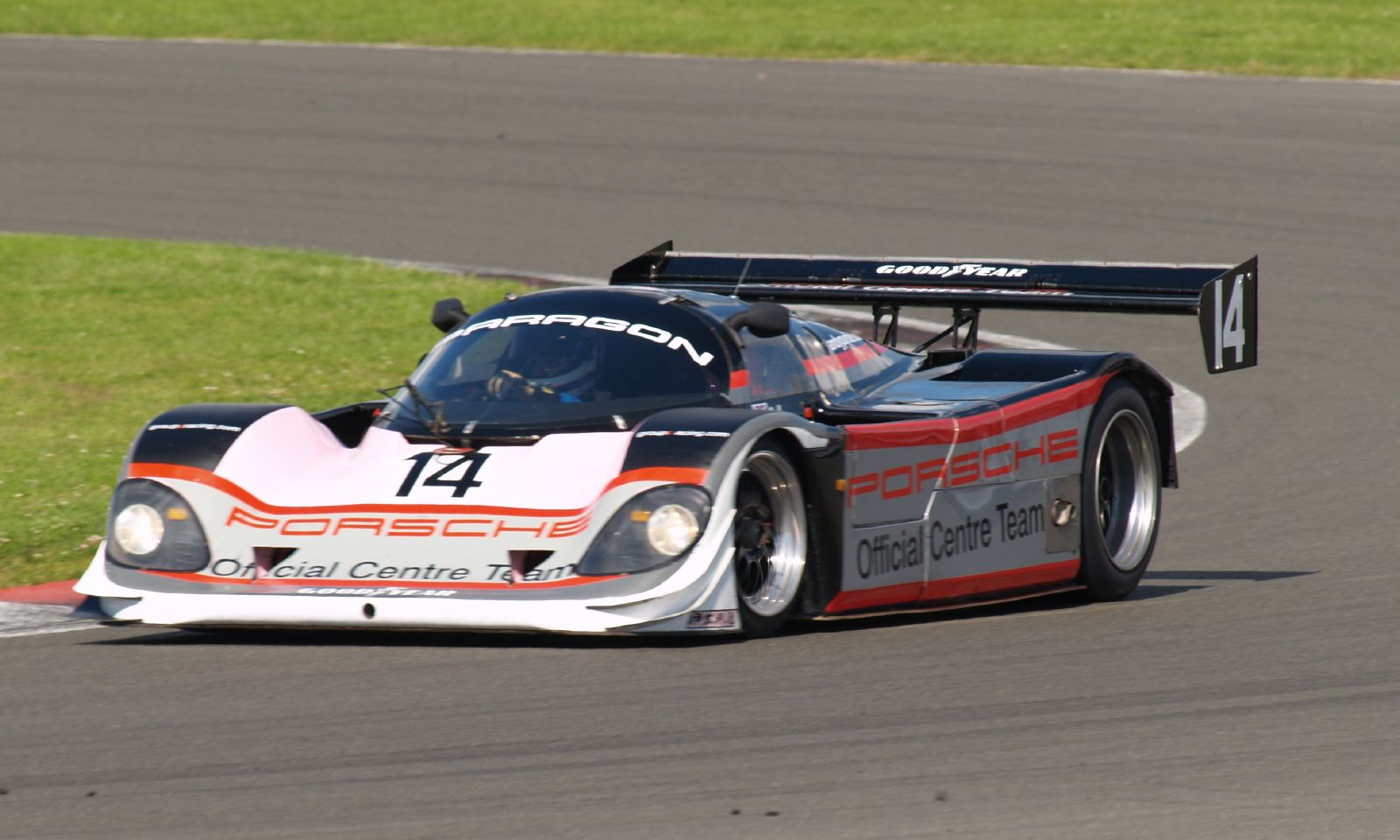
RLR Porsche 962 GTi

Although not contesting the Championship, the Porsche factory sent crews to support their favoured customer teams: Joest, Brun and Schuppan – all with the 1988 3.0-litre water-cooled engine. Lead designer Norbert Singer prepared the cars for the Joest Racing team. They had three cars entered, of which the lead one, driven by Bob Wollek and Hans-Joachim Stuck, had just come out of the Weissach factory. The other two cars were ex-works chassis – to be driven by Frank Jelinski/Pierre-Henri Raphanel/"John Winter" (Louis Krages) and the very experienced Henri Pescarolo/Claude Ballot-Léna (with 22 Le Mans starts each), with Jean-Louis Ricci. At Dijon, against the Jaguar and Sauber works teams, Wollek and Jelinski had got a surprise victory in the new car – the first victory for a Porsche since 1987. Walter Brun was continuing with his expensive, unsuccessful foray into Formula 1 with his EuroBrun team, yet still managed to assemble five cars for an all-out effort at Le Mans. His two lead cars were new chassis built on honeycomb/carbon-fibre tubs, and dubbed "962C-BM". The other three cars were a mix of old and new 962s – Brun and his F1 driver Oscar Larrauri had the newest car. In the absence of the works team, Vern Schuppan raced with his own team. With Eje Elgh and fellow-Australian Gary Brabham, they ran the ex-works Porsche used by the Andretti family last year. The team's second car was a brand-new chassis entrusted to Will Hoy, Dominic Dobson and young Jean Alesi (currently leading the Formula 3000 series, and about to start his Formula 1 career). The Kremer brothers returned with their two honeycomb/carbon CK6 variants. Clocked at 380 kp/h (235 mph), they were the fastest Porsches in the field. Richard Lloyd's team had missed the previous Le Mans but were back with two honeycomb GTi models of their own design. Lloyd had got Derek Bell as his lead driver, with Tiff Needell and James Weaver. The other car had 20-race veteran David Hobbs racing with Formula 3000 debutants Damon Hill and Steven Andskär The other three Porsches were small teams who had taken the big commitment to run a full season: the German Obermaier Racing, with its Primagaz sponsorship; Briton Tim Lee-Davey had a car bought from Porsche GB; and the French Alméras brothers back at Le Mans for the first time since the 1970s.

Nissan was becoming the car to beat in the IMSA competition with the Geoff Brabham winning the 1988 GTP Drivers' Championship for the Electramotive Engineering team. To manage its World Championship programme better, Nissan Motorsports Europe was set up at a new facility in England. March was dropped as chassis-supplier in favour of Lola Cars, who were supplying chassis to Electramotive in IMSA. Eric Broadley and Andy Scriven designed the R89C around the new Nissan 3.5-litre VRH35 engine. The twin-turbo double-overhead cam unit could reach over 800 bhp. The chassis was derived from the Lola T810 currently dominating the IMSA series with Electramotive, itself derived from the old T600 of the early '80s.

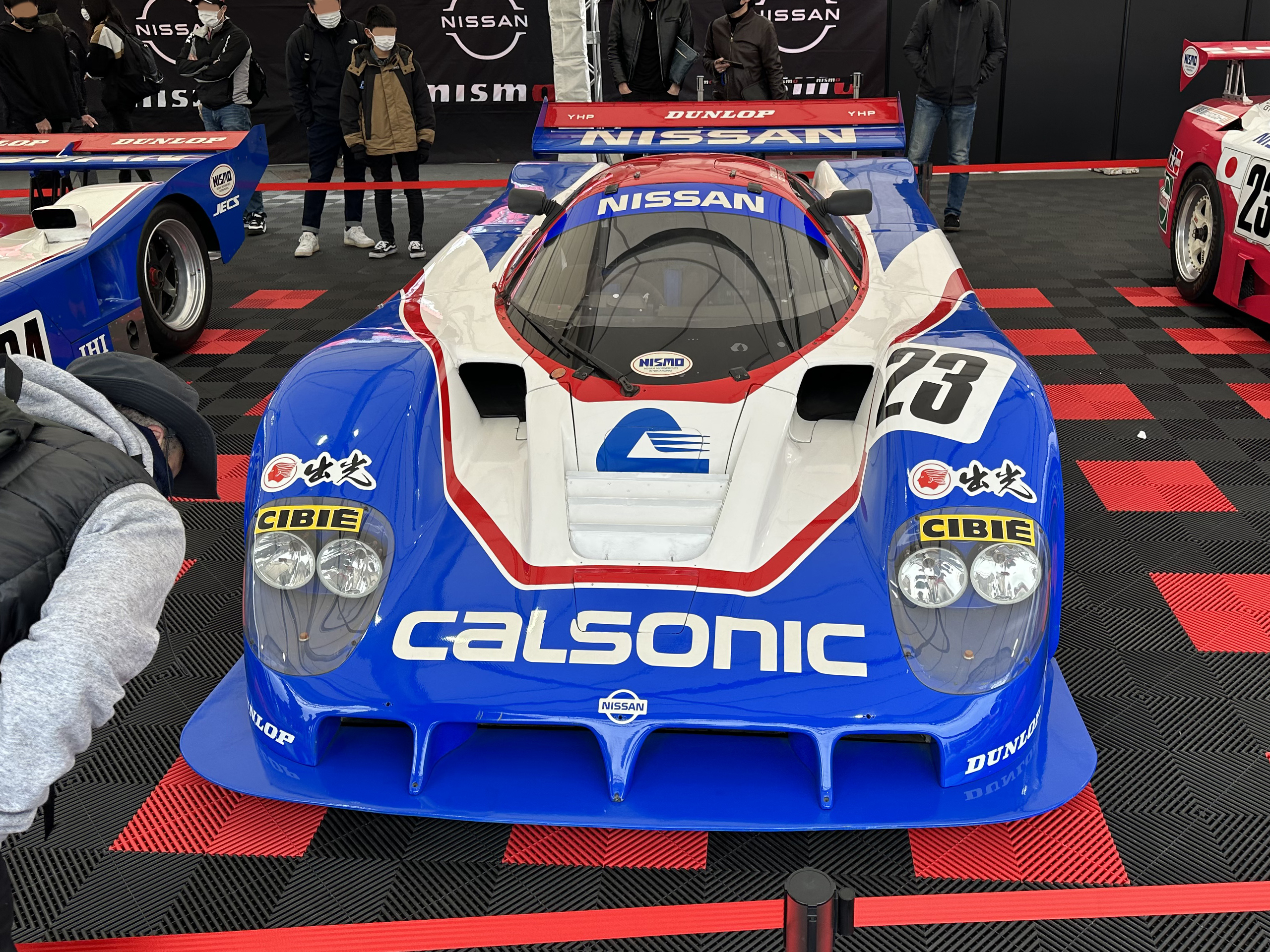
Nissan R89C

Three cars came to Le Mans, under experienced team manager Keith Greene. The European works drivers were Mark Blundell and Julian Bailey, joined by F3000 driver Martin Donnelly. A brand-new chassis had the all-Japanese crew of Kazuyoshi Hoshino/Toshio Suzuki/Masahiro Hasemi, while the third car had the IMSA drivers Geoff Brabham/Chip Robinson/Arie Luyendyk, who, earlier in the year, had together won the Sebring 12-Hours.

Like Nissan, Toyota had invested in setting up a new European base for its Championship season. Based in England, they brought in Dave "Beaky" Sims as team manager. This year's 89C-V featured the 3.2-litre turbo engine the company had started working on last year. For the first time, Toyota TOM'S brought three cars to Le Mans, along with a test-car. Former Jaguar drivers, John Watson and Johnny Dumfries had joined the team and were paired with team regular Geoff Lees. The other works drivers, Paolo Barilla/ Hitoshi Ogawa had the second car with Ross Cheever. The third car was one of last year's 2.1-litre 88C models, driven by Hoshino/Suzuki/Artzet.

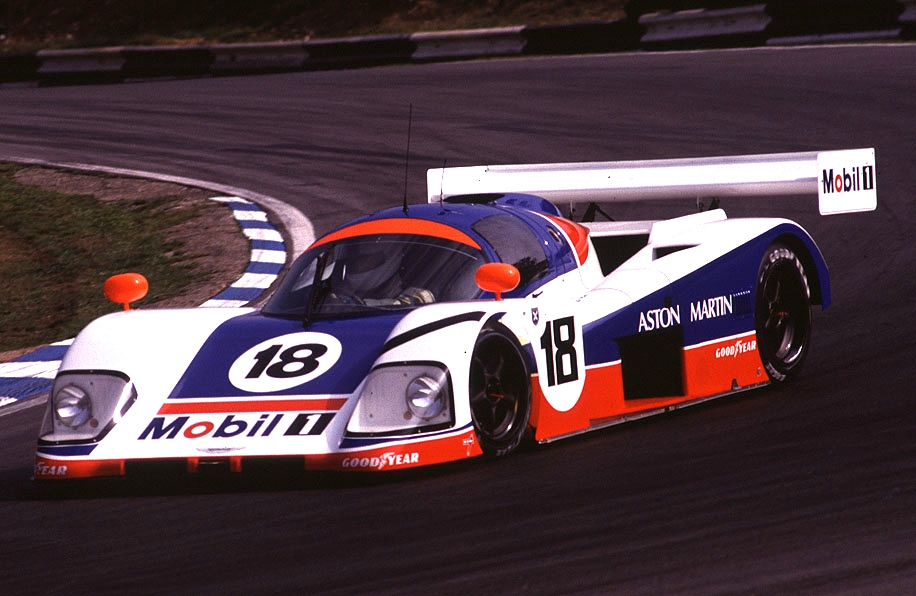
Aston Martin AMR1

On the thirtieth anniversary of their only previous victory, Aston Martin returned to Le Mans with a new car: the AMR-1. Now owned by Ford, Aston Martin had partnered up with the Ecurie Ecosse team of Richard Williams and Ray Mallock, to form Proteus Technology (Protech) with Williams as manager. Swedish-Canadian Max Boxstrom designed a Kevlar/carbon-fibre body around a radical aerodynamic layout that created a lot of downforce. The old Aston Martin 6.0-litre V8 was taken over by the American specialist car-convertors, Callaway. Now fitted with four-valve cylinders, it could develop 685 bhp with Zytek fuel injection. Their first chassis was destroyed in testing at Donington Park when David Leslie had a driveshaft failure. That meant missing the opening round and therefore incurring the US$250,000 fine from the FIA. A disappointing race at Dijon showed the downforce was excessive and Boxstrom was dismissed. Rushed efforts were made to reduce as much drag as possible before Le Mans. The two cars sent to France had Écosse manager Mallock, Leslie and David Sears in one, and veteran Brian Redman with Costas Los and Michael Roe in the other. The cars ran with a black stripe on their wings in commemoration of John Wyer, who had died two months earlier. Wyer had been the Aston Martin team-manager masterminding their race victory in 1959.

Last year the small WM Secateva team had achieved immortality by recording the fastest speed ever at Le Mans. Yet this did not lead to a marked funding boost and they could not run a full international season. However, when Le Mans left the championship, they were motivated to hastily prepare an entry with the P88 cars from last year. With Michelin's new contract with Sauber, they had to modify the suspension for new tyres, and revised the rear wing. Roger Dorchy ran his famous car from 1988, while Pessiot and Raulet were reunited with the other chassis. Unlike WM, the other French local did commit to a full WSC season, to be eligible for Le Mans. Yves Courage's team had three of their new C22 – replacing the one destroyed the previous year. Designed around the Porsche 3-litre turbo eingine, with water-cooling, it was given improved aerodynamics and air-ducting for the long straights. However, the top speed was a disappointing 365 kp/h (225 mph). A problem arose in May when one of the cars was badly damaged when its car-transporter was in an accident. Funding was tight with the full-year entry now that the team was without their usual sponsor, Primagaz. Concerned that they would be liable for a hefty fine for not meeting their requisite entry, the team accepted an offer from the Team LeMans to put the car they ran the previous year under the Cougar entry. Rebadged as a Cougar R87V, the Nissan-March 88G was detuned by NISMO to give better endurance, but this dropped its top speed down to 310 kp/h (195 mph).

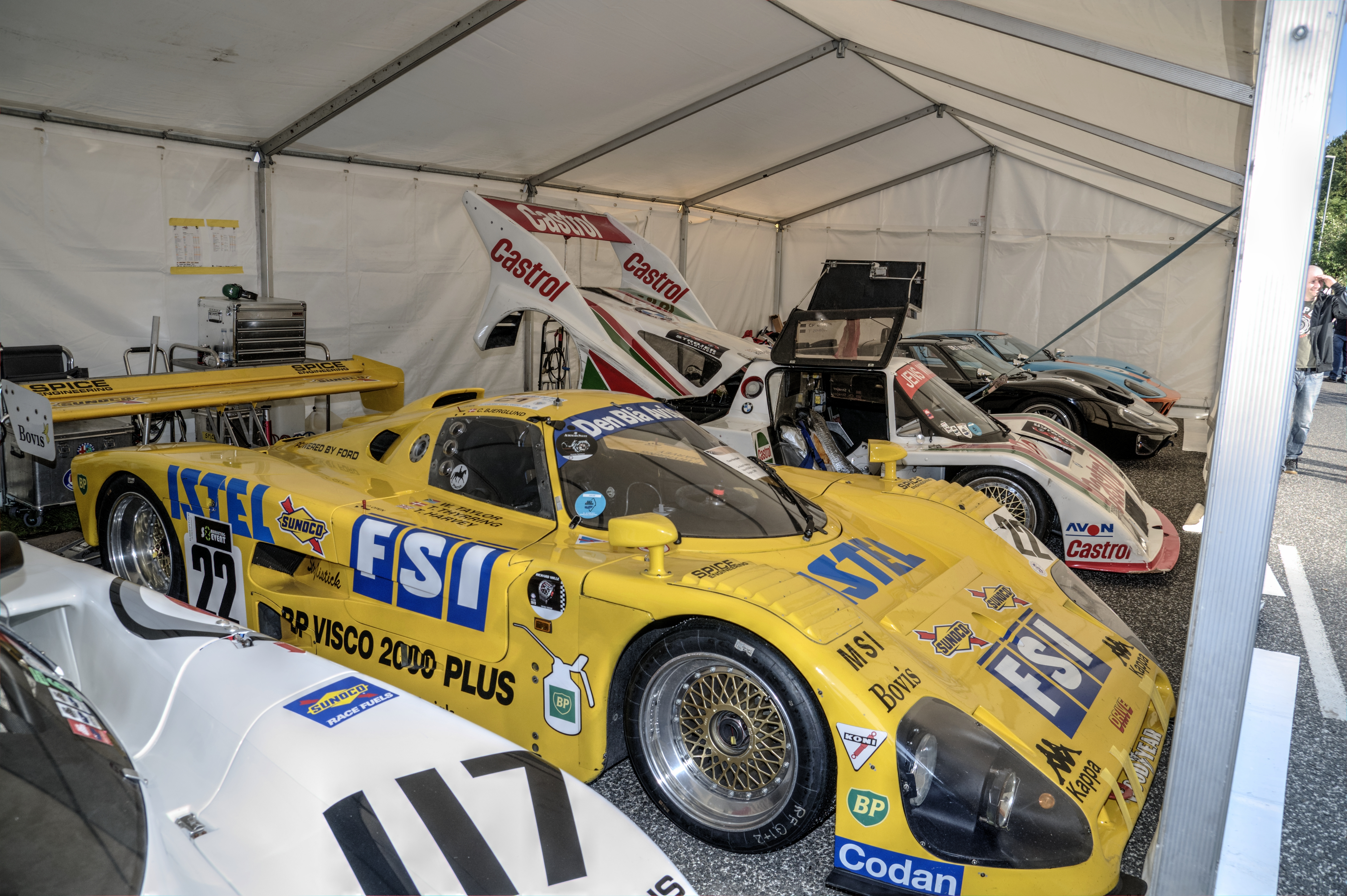
Spice SE89C

Spice Engineering was dominating the C2 and IMSA-Lights classes. Now that its contract with Pontiac had ended, the constructor took the opportunity to build a car to the FIA's new 750 kg 3.5-litre Group C formula. They chose to base the car around the latest iteration of the famous Cosworth DFV, the DFZ. The engine was prepared by John Nicholson, while the new chassis was designed by Graham Humphrys. With a longer nose, the wheelbase was 50mm longer and the car 100mm wider. However, with only being able to reach 330 kp/h (205 mph), the car was no faster than their own C2 cars. Two cars were sent to Le Mans: Team principal Gordon Spice (who had announced he would retire from driving after this race) had his regular co-driver Ray Bellm, along with American Lyn St. James. The other works drivers, Thorkild Thyrring and Wayne Taylor would be joined by Tim Harvey.

=== Group C2 ===
Spice Engineering kept up its strong showing in the junior class with the new SE89. Eight chassis were built, four each for Group C2 and IMSA Lights. Two of the SE89Cs were entered at Le Mans, one from Graff Racing, with works support, and the other for Chamberlain Engineering. Both were powered with the reliable 3.3-litre Cosworth DFL engine. Chamberlain also entered his older RE86C car, with its 1.9-litre turbocharged Hart engine. His regular team drivers, Fermin Velez and Nick Adams had the new car, while for Jean-Philippe Grand Le Mans was his sole focus for the season. As the cars to beat, there were another four Spices entered: the 1988-championship winning car had been bought by Don Shead and entered by Team Mako, with its Cosworth powerplant tuned by Swiss engine-specialist Heini Mader. The new France Prototeam had bought the ex-Ricci SE88C, also fitted with a Mader-prepared Cosworth. GP Motorsport returned with their SE87C, while the final Spice was, in fact, the first Spice chassis made – the SE86C of Swiss Pierre-Alain Lombardi, with another Mader-Cosworth.

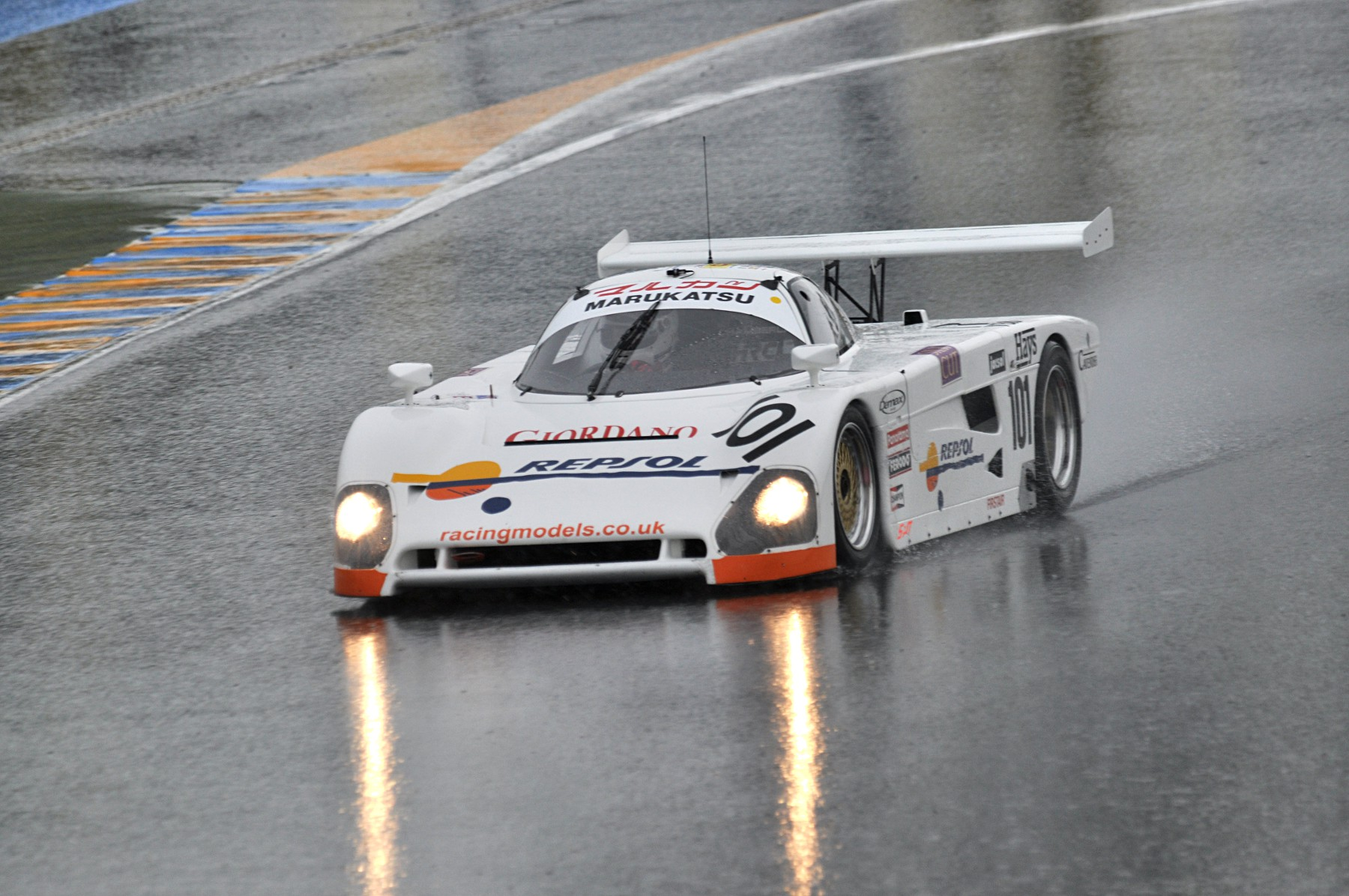
Chamberlain Spice SE88C

Tiga Race Cars had lost its market to Spice and was in severe financial difficulties. The GC289 was an evolution of the 287, with improved rear suspension and cooling. Three of the five chassis built were at Le Mans, all with the 3.3-litre DFL engine. The works car was driven by John Sheldon, Robin Donovan and Max Cohen-Olivar. Kelmar Racing had two of the GC288s upgraded to 289 set-up, one of which was leased to Noël del Bello who had put aside his Sauber this year.

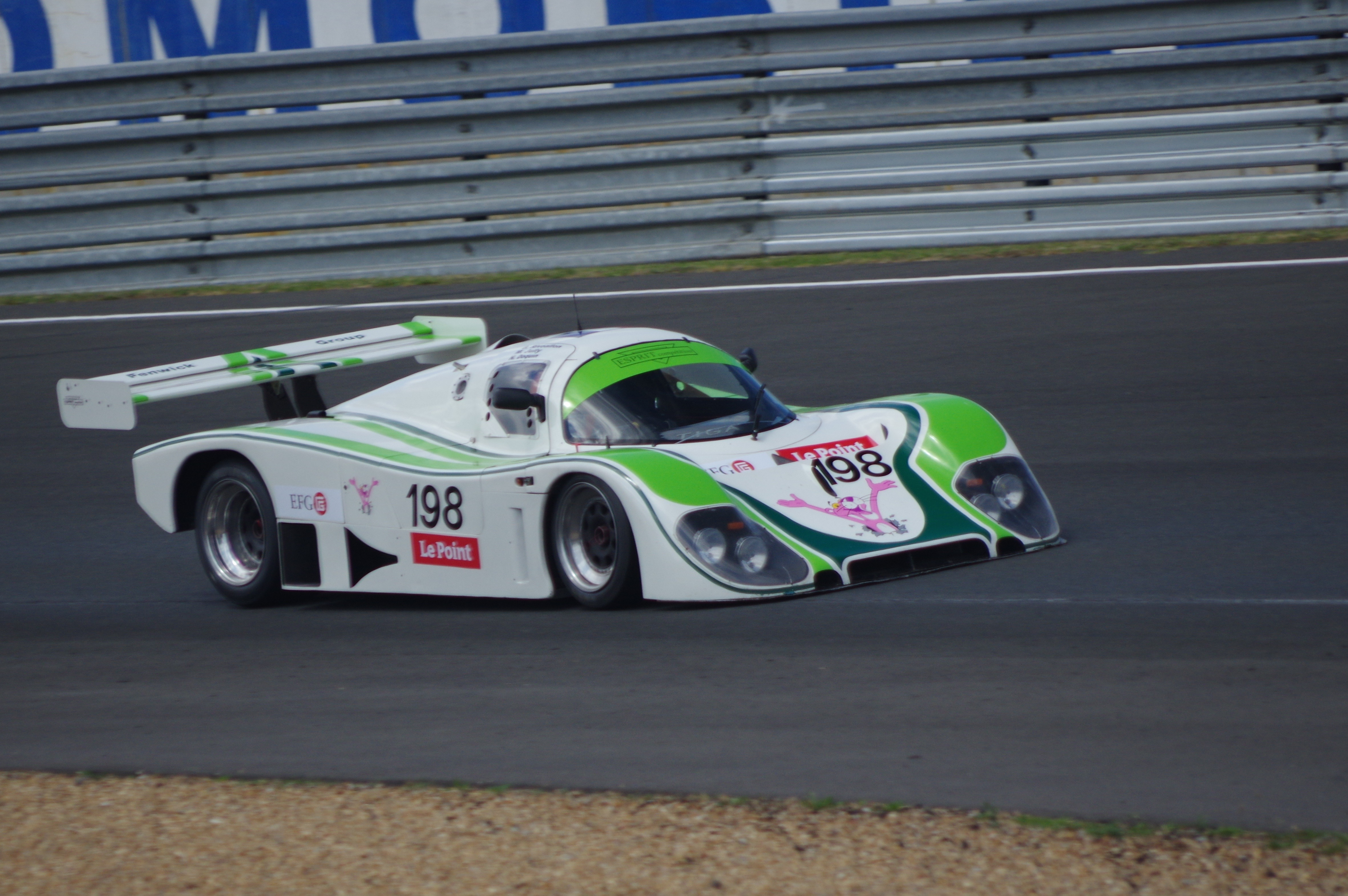
Tiga GC289

As well as their cars in the primary class, this year Courage also entered a car into C2. The three-year old chassis had originally been a C12, then progressively upgraded. Now called the C20LM, it was fitted with an older Porsche 2.8-litre turbo engine and modified to comply with the C2 regulations. Now owned by French driving-school director, Philippe Farjon, he knew a careful fuel-consumption strategy would be needed with the big turbo and the tighter fuel restrictions. A change in FIA regulations now allowed teams to enter cars of different makes. The France Prototeam took advantage of this update to also enter an Argo JM19 owned by Jean Massaoudi alongside their Spice.

ADA Engineering had sold their 03 chassis to John Pool's Plumtree Racing, but keen to return to Le Mans, the team repaired and renovated their second chassis as the ADA 02B with its Nicholson-Cosworth DFL. Pool joined owner-driver Ian Harrower, with Lawrence Bristow, for the race.

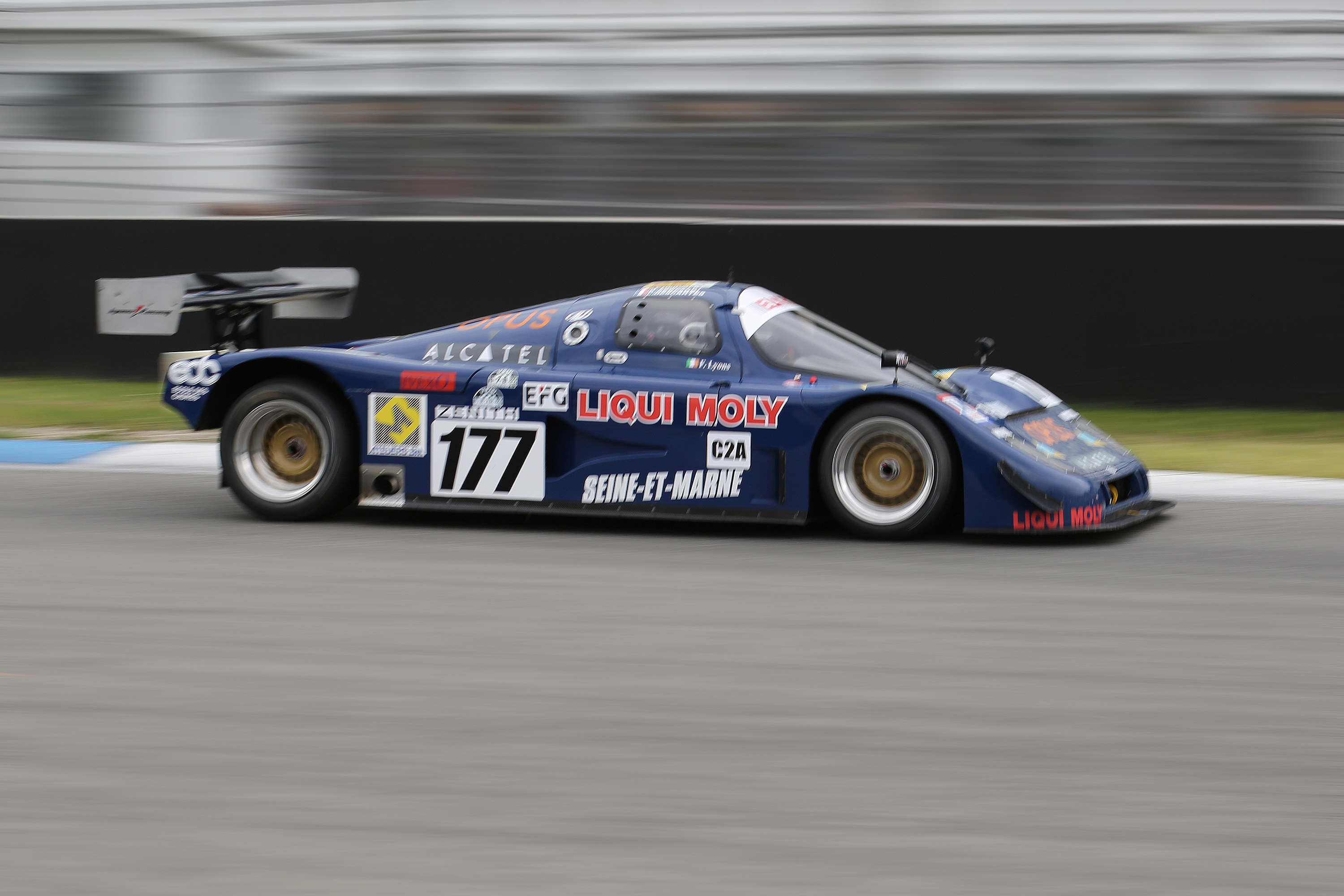
ALD C289

After reasonable success recently, small French driver-constructor Louis Descartes had four cars at Le Mans. Along with last year's 04, there was the new C289 that the team ran in the Championship. Designed by Descartes, it was a carbon-fibre/Kevlar monocoque chassis with ground effects and the rear wing mounted off the gearbox. With bigger brakes, it was overweight and only had a top speed of 315 kp/h (195 mph) from the Nicholson-DFL. The car set-up was done by former Renault-Alpine driver Alain Serpaggi. The other two chassis, 05 and 06, were entered by French hillclimber Didier Bonnet. Both were fitted with the 3.5-litre BMW engine and heavily modified. In fact, the 05 was altered so much from its original form that Descartes disowned it.

=== IMSA-GTP ===
Mazdaspeed kept developing their rotary engine project in the splendid isolation of the GTP class. This year's model, the 767B, had improved the aerodynamics and shed 25 kg. Work on the quad-rotor 13J-M engine, generating 620 bhp, could now get the car up to almost 360 kp/h (220 mph). Two cars were ready for Le Mans: regular team drivers David Kennedy and Pierre Dieudonné ran one, with Chris Hodgetts (subbing-in for an ill Yoshimi Katayama), and the other by Takashi Yorino/Hervé Regout and Elliot Forbes-Robinson (whose previous visit to Le Mans had been back in 1971). The third entry was one of last year's 767 models, driven by Yojiro Terada/Marc Duez/Volker Weidler.

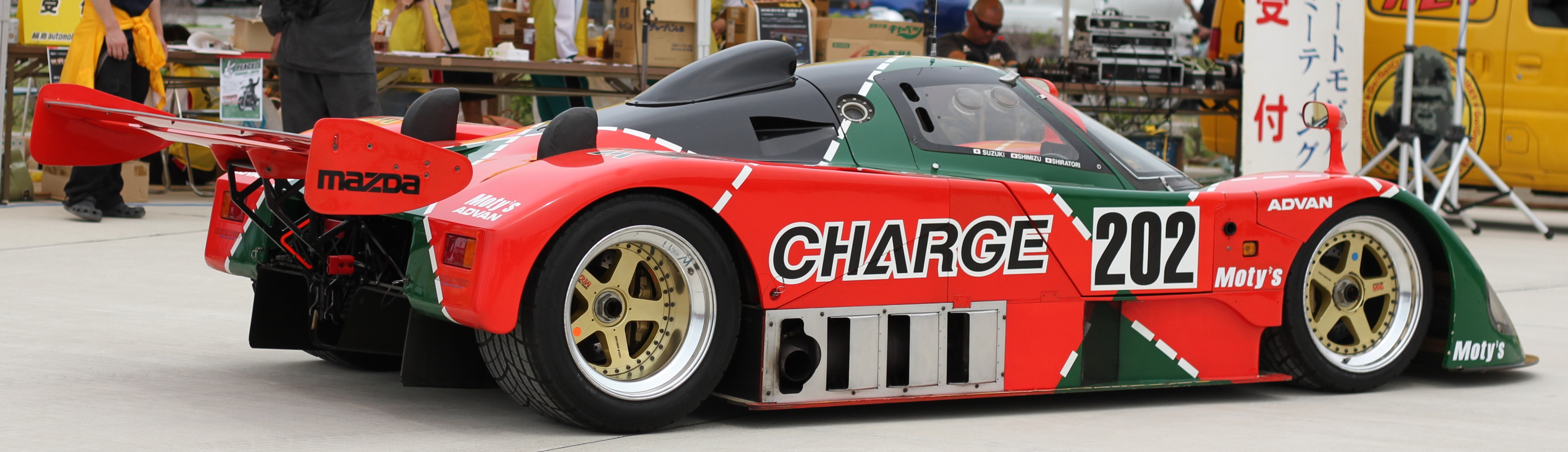
Mazda 767B

== Practice and Qualifying ==
Practice week had a tragic start, with a terrible accident on the night before, when a TWR crewman was killed crossing the road on the Ligne Droite (which formed the Hunaudières straight). Rain on Wednesday limited the number of fast runs that could be done on the first day of practice. However, Thursday was dry and sunny, and in the evening the Saubers showed their mettle with Schlesser putting in a 3:16.9 to set the standard. His team-mate Baldi then beat that with 3:15.7, breaking the speed radar on the Hunaudières straight at an incredible 400 kp/h (248 mph). Then out of nowhere, Geoff Lees wound the boost right up on the Toyota and stunned the paddock with a 3:15.5. Pushed to the limit, Schlesser went out and responded with a 3:15.0 to secure pole position. The officials then annulled Lees' time as it was set in a designated test-car, not a race-car. A basic mistake that had already cost Toyota previously, at a Suzuka round. Therefore, Sauber-Mercedes locked out the front row after all. Lammers and Jones put their Jaguars in third and fourth, with Stuck's Joest-Porsche next – the end of Porsche's run of four consecutive pole positions. In the end, Lees was mired down in a lowly 17th.

There were a few issues in practice: the Sauber of Jochen Mass lost its fifth gear which impeded its practice – they were down in 11th. The team cautioned their drivers that gear-changes would need to be more measured for the race to last the 24 hours. The RLR Porsche was one of the victims of the Wednesday rain, in a multiple pile-up at the Ford Chicane. The France Prototeam Spice aquaplaned off first, and then Needell came through and skated off hitting the C2 car. Lavaggi arrived on the scene next in the Kremer Porsche, followed by Taylor in the C1 Spice and both spun into the gravel. Taylor was getting out of his car when he saw Duez's Mazda fishtailing off the road towards him. Leaping back in the car, Duez missed Taylor, but hit his car head-on. Despite all the chaos, the cars were all repaired overnight and the only injury was a bruised arm for Taylor. After a troublesome Wednesday, the Nissan team had a far better second day. The team realised the rear wings were mounted too low and causing instability. Once that was remedied, despite poor brakes, they were back on the pace and qualified 12th, 15th and 19th. The new Aston Martins were a big disappointment. So much effort had been put into generating downforce, they could only reach 350 kp/h (220 mph) along the Hunaudières, barely keeping them ahead of the C2 cars. They also suffered from chronic "porpoising" as the cars got into a pendulum-like cycle of gaining and losing downforce, that was both dangerous and detrimental to shaking the drivers and engine to bits. They qualified a woeful 32nd (3:34.1) and 40th (3:40.1). WM also had a terrible qualifying. Dorchy, hero of 1988, had been able to set a 3:27 lap, reaching a sedate (for WM) 385 kp/h (240 mph) but in the evening session, his co-driver Maissoneuve was accelerating out of Mulsanne when a hydraulic line burned through, setting off a major engine fire. By the time he was able to come to a stop up against the barriers at Indianapolis, the flames had got into the cockpit. Although he got out just in time, the car was a write-off. It was no better for their team-mates: they had a small fire and two engine failures. The team was fortunate to be able to salvage the engine from the Dorchy wreck and spent Friday night and Saturday morning installing it.

Quickest down the speed-trap was Schlesser who reached the mystical 400 kp/h (248 mph). The next quickest was Roger Dorchy, who got to 385 kp/h (240 mph) in his WM before it blew up. Third-fastest was Ferté in the #4 Jaguar, at 380 kp/h (235 mph). In GTP, Takashi Yorino raced the new Mazda 767B round in 3:25.5, fully 14 seconds faster than the team's best time last year. His qualifying place of 16th was the highest position Mazda had achieved at Le Mans. His teammates both went off-track during practice, leaving the pitcrew with a lot of work to get the cars ready for race-day. This year, the C2 class was well off the pace of the C1 leaders. The best time was by the Graff Spice with a 3:38.7 to start 37th on the grid. The other new SE89C, of Chamberlain Engineering, was second quickest – a good effort since when practice started, they were still waiting for a qualifying-engine to arrive. In fact, Spices took the top-six positions in the class. The France Prototeam Spice did get repaired overnight, but then lost the daytime practice with a broken driveshaft and had to qualify in the dark. At the back of the field were the ALDs. The misfortune of the WM team, opened a place for Louis Descartes' new C289, however both Didier Bonnet's failed to qualify.

== Race ==
=== Start ===
Once again, a huge British contingent made the exodus to the race, anticipating a successful repeat of last year's heroics. Saturday was a warm sunny day. Although the silver Saubers led the start, by the third lap Jones and Nielsen had barged past to give Jaguar a 1-2. Meanwhile, the other two Jags had fallen to the back of the field, having pitted on consecutive laps for suspected punctures. The WM had not been ready to take the grid and started from the pit-lane, receiving a big cheer from the grandstand as they went out already a lap behind the field. Julian Bailey, in the Nissan, had made a lightning start off the sixth row of the grid and also passed the Saubers. He was challenging Nielsen for second when he made a lunge at the Mulsanne corner – an unnecessary risk so early in the race. The cars collided and slowly limped back to the pits. The Nissan came off worst – the furious pit team found the suspension too bent and cracked to continue, and Bailey was the race's first retirement.

The race did not start well for the ADA team. After only half an hour, Bristow brought the car in minus its right door. Although they fitted another one, that too blew off just three laps later. With no spares, a call was put out on Radio Le Mans and the original was returned by the over-enthusiastic souvenir hunter in the crowd. From the start the two Spice SE89s took the class lead, with “Gigi” Taverna in the Chamberlain getting a break on the rest of the class, lapping them all after just two hours. By the time night fell, there was a 3-lap between the Chamberlain and Graff cars, and a further 3 laps back to the Argo and Porto Kaleo Tiga.

As the Saubers slipped back into their designated race-pace, it was the hot-pink Joest Porsche driven by the experienced Wollek that was chasing Jones in the leading Jaguar. The leading cars started pitting around lap 12, and already some of the top teams were having issues. Elgh jumped into the Schuppan Porsche, sitting in the top10, but lost two laps when it would not restart. The Mercedes challenge faded in the second hour: Reuter had just taken over from Mass, but slipped out of the top-20 when he had to pit after running over exhaust debris on the back straight. Then Cudini spun the pole-sitting C9 at the Dunlop Curve avoiding a back-marker and had to spend eight minutes in the pits while the bodywork was repaired (dropping to 24th). Acheson, in the other Sauber, was driving conservatively to conserve the tyres. In the early evening, Daly had almost a minute's lead over Wollek and Raphanel in the two Joest cars. Patrick Tambay was driving hard in the #1 Jaguar, getting back up to 4th ahead of the Acheson/Brancatelli Mercedes. At the third pit-stops (around lap 38-40), Wollek took the lead for a couple of laps in the pit sequence until he, too, came into refuel. He was also followed in by Dominic Dobson in the second Schuppan Porsche fielding a badly dented nose and tail – he had just been nerfed into the barriers by Wollek cutting his overtake too fine.

Suddenly, in the 4th hour on lap 50, Daly lost all power coming onto Hunaudières, and the Porsche sailed by into the lead. Coached by the pit-crew via radio, Daly got out, pulled the back off the gearbox, and pushed it into 2nd gear and eventually made it back to the pits, but an hour was lost. Meanwhile, the two Jaguars delayed in the first laps had been relentlessly powering back through the field – the Ferté brothers were now second and Lammers in third, until his co-driver Gilbert-Scott brought the car in with a broken exhaust. Falling to sixth, Tambay leapt back in and started another charge to make up time. All this drama left Stuck (Porsche) with a decent lead over Acheson (Mercedes), Ferté (Jaguar), Jelinski (Porsche), the Japanese-driven Nissan, and Brun in the best of his Porsche stable. At 7.30pm, Sekiya had a big accident in his Kremer CK6 at the Porsche Curves. Although looking spectacular, the Japanese driver was unhurt and an extended local caution was sufficient for the safety-crews to repair the stretch of flattened barrier. Soon afterward Dumfries slammed his Toyota into the Armco further along the road. Although he got near the pit entry (at one point somehow dragging a Japanese TV camera along with him), the suspension was too wrecked to be able to turn in and he had to abandon the car. This was the end of a wretched weekend for Toyota, as the other two cars had already been retired.

The race was interrupted at 8.45pm by a full-course caution when Dominic Dobson's Schuppan-Porsche had a major fuel-fire. The system may have sustained damage in the earlier incident, and when he was exiting the Mulsanne corner, the rear of the car suddenly erupted in a big ball of flame. He managed to pull over approaching the Indianapolis corner, and despite having troubles releasing his safety belts, got out without injury. As it was, the five pace-cars were only out for three laps, without compromising the race.

=== Night ===
By 10pm, the Joest team were running 1-2 and Stuck had built a 2-lap buffer over Jelinski. The Baldi/Acheson/Brancatelli Sauber was third, a minute ahead of the squabbling Lammers-Jaguar and the Nissan. The Ferté/Salazar Jaguar had lost time in the pits again, this time due to a faulty exhaust. At 10.30pm, Davy Jones brought his car into the pits with a terminal engine problem. An hour later, Raphanel brought in the second-placed Porsche losing water. Topping it up was not enough and they soon retired. However, the Saubers were enjoying the cooler air of the night and started moving up the leaderboard. By midnight, Wollek and Stuck had been leading for six hours, and now had a 2-lap lead over their opposition. After a few stops with overheating, the Baldi Sauber had slipped back to third, overtaken by Lammers, while teammate Mass had charged back up to fifth. Larrauri was up to sixth in the Brun Porsche (constantly having to push to make up for his slower co-drivers); with the Nielsen and Ferté Jaguars, the second Nissan, and the remaining Joest Porsche rounding out the top-10.

Then at 1.20am Stuck came into the pit with their engine overheating. He spent a quarter-hour getting an errant radiator hose replaced, losing his 3-lap lead to the Lammers Jaguar. It meant they would need to top up with water at every subsequent pit-stop. Through the middle of the night, the #1 Jaguar built their lead to almost two laps over the Baldi and Tambay in the Sauber. Mass had done a strong double-stint, putting in 3m24s laps and getting his Sauber back into third, right behind his teammate. The #2 Jaguar was trading fourth place with the Joest Porsche that was periodically stopping for top-ups of water. Often through the night, these three cars were barely fifteen seconds apart. Baldi recovered a lap again when the leading Jaguar had to pit for a slow-puncture. The Hasemi/Hoshino/Suzuki Nissan had run very well, mixing it with the other works teams, holding down a steady fourth or fifth place going into Sunday morning. However, just before half-time they were forced out by a leaking water-hose that lead to overheating and a cracked cylinder head. Their remaining car, with the IMSA drivers, had had all manner of problems with brakes, causing half a dozen spins and off-track excursions. Despite that, by dawn they were in the top-10 and even up to fifth at breakfast time, until an oil leak ruined the engine and ended their race soon afterward.

=== Morning ===
Come the dawn, the Lammers/Tambay/Gilbert-Scott was still leading, pursued by the two Saubers. Then it all started unravelling for Jaguar. The Ferté/Salazar had come into the pits without 3rd gear while running 5th and lost 70 minutes, resuming in 16th place. At 5.30am, Nielsen retired from 4th with a broken engine. Then less than an hour later, after leading for five hours, Lammers brought the #1 Jaguar into the pits covered in oil with another gearbox failure for the team – a seal had broken and the oil had leaked out. This time the repairs only took the pit-crew 50 minutes, and the resumed in 9th, 10 laps down and the best-placed Jaguar. All this drama left Baldi and Mass racing each other in their Saubers, with the Joest, Brun and Schuppan Porsches filling out the top-five. The latter had made an excellent comeback through the night after Gary Brabham spun out at Indianapolis at 11pm, dropping them down to 17th. Suddenly there were a spate of retirements: Larrauri's Brun Porsche (4th), the last Nissan (5th) and the second RLR Porsche (10th) all with engine failures; as well as the two uncompetitive works Spices (within an hour of each other), and the March-Cougar.

Then at 7.30am, fading brakes could not slow Baldi soon enough at the Dunlop chicane and he spun off. That was the only invitation Dickens needed to zip past to take the lead, that extended when Baldi then had to pit for a new nosecone and to hand over to Acheson. The Joest and Schuppan Porsches were next, with the recovering Sauber of Schlesser and Jaguar of Tambay now back up to fifth and sixth respectively. Tambay was travelling in convoy with Alain Ferté in the other remaining Jaguar (12th). Together, the two were flying, putting in 3m21s laps, and Ferté set the fastest lap of the race. In a situation similar to the Saubers earlier, this nearly ended badly when Tambay had a lurid 360 degree spin at Tertre Rouge right in front of his teammate and on live TV. With the field thinning out, Stuck and Wollek were also picking up the pace, reminding the Saubers the race was not sewn up yet. By midday, although lapping 6–7 seconds slower than their pursuers, they had a 2-lap cushion.

The night had been brutal on the C2 class, with half the original entry of 14 retiring in the darkness. This left only six cars running in the class. The Chamberlain Spice had been having a trouble-free run in the lead, but the others had all had issues and they were strung out over 50 laps apart. The top-qualifying Graff Spice was initially running second, and latterly was third until it lost 100 minutes fixing a gearbox problem. Then, at 9am the Chamberlain car came into the pits with a misfire. Despite the crew's efforts, it was from terminal electrical damage. The car had run faultlessly till now, unlike so many in the class. The crew had contemplated putting it onto 7 cylinders for the next six hours but despondently packed up instead. As it was, it still took over 90 minutes for them to lose the class-lead. That fell to the France Petroleum Argo for a few hours until they lost 90 minutes replacing the clutch (that eventually left them fourth in class). They were overtaken by the Courage-March which had lost half an hour during the night changing the steering rack. Thereafter they had been running well.

The small WM team had a terrible race. Having started from the pitlane, within an hour they had to repair the gearbox. Through the night, they replaced the oil pump, water pump, wheel bearings and front suspension. The car had spent seven hours in the pits and was always at the tail of the field. Nevertheless, they would not admit defeat. In the morning, Raulet had a tyre blowout at speed on the Mulsanne straight. The final blow was a repeat of their team-mates' demise in practice, when an engine-fire erupted at Mulsanne corner. Despite the smoke in his cockpit, Pessiot made it to an access road at Indianapolis and got out. Such were the delays they suffered, their 110 laps did not even exceed those of the Joest Porsche retiring over 13 hours earlier. In stark contrast, the two new Mazdas had also been running very well, always sitting in the top-15, and by 9am had now moved up to fill out the bottom of the top-10. Regout had stopped at 2.50am to get a rear suspension unit replaced, costing a quarter-hour, and the other car had a 1-minute stop to replace a wishbone but otherwise, they kept pressing on.

=== Finish and post-race ===
Soon afterward, the second Kremer car, running tenth, retired in spectacular fashion. Just after passing the pits, the engine of the Kenwood Porsche burst into flames. Takahashi was able to run off into the gravel trap at the Dunlop chicane and bailed out safely. The car was quickly consumed in the conflagration. Just over an hour later, the sixth car to have a fire at the event went up. Tiff Needell was 7th in the RLR Porsche when his car also caught alight passing the pits. Needell pulled over straight away and got out unscathed in front of a relieved grandstand of spectators. The drama continued when the Schuppan Porsche struggled into the pits. Needing a gearbox change, they dropped from fourth to twelfth. However, the Sauber crews were not relaxing – with a nervousness on the endurance of their cars' own transmissions. At 2.45pm Acheson had only driven a lap after taking over from Baldi for the last stint, when he got a gear-selector problem and pitted straight away. Team Manager Price decided there was no time for a major rebuild, so the crew jammed the car into fifth and sent Acheson back out. In this case, the extreme torque of the Mercedes engine was a big help as it enabled him to keep going without changing gears, albeit only doing laps in the 4m10s range. Wollek though was not in a position to press the issue – their hard driving had left them tight on fuel, that was exacerbated by a slipping clutch. In the last few stops the crew had even poured cola on the clutch to clear off the leaking oil.

As Mass eased up, teammates Acheson and Schlesser were able to close up and, in formation that is how they crossed the line. Or they would have but the crowd invasion of the track prevented them reaching the finish line, so technically not completing the lap. Sauber secured its 1-2 victory. Wollek brought the Joest Porsche home in third, 2 laps behind Acheson and nursing a slipping clutch that prevented them pushing for second. After getting back to fourth early in the afternoon, the wounded Lammers Jaguar came home a further 2 laps back. With Schlesser finishing fifth, all three of the Sauber-Mercedes had finished at their first competitive attempt at a 24-hour race. A satisfactory race for Joest was completed with sixth to their French-crewed car, which had run consistently apart from a leery moment when a tyre burst at speed on the Hunaudières straight.

For the second year running, Mazda got all three cars home, crossing the line in their own formation finish. Kennedy and Dieudonné took their third consecutive class-win, coming in 7th overall. They covered just shy of 5000 km (almost 3100 miles) which was 32 laps further than Mazda had ever done at Le Mans. Their team-mates finished 9th and 12th. In C2, it had been a battle of attrition but in the end, Philippe Farjon brought his Cougar C20 home for victory. They had had their trials getting there, having to change the steering rack overnight and then in the last hours, the drivers were struggling to keep one of the doors shut. But it all stayed together, such was their lead, and they finished 14th, six laps ahead of the Mako Spice. The McNeil team had lost their time overnight after two excursions into the gravel by Ross Hyett had meant 75minutes in the pits for repairs. The 19th, and final, car home was the Graff Spice. Although 98 laps (2025 km/825 miles) behind the winners after their gearbox and battery delays, the calculations showed they had run the most economical race, with the Challenge Econergie prize by a wide margin over the two Saubers.

Sauber went on to win all the remaining races in the Sports-Prototype Championship, which had effectively become a sprint-series without the Le Mans round. Jaguar introduced their new XJR-11 but teething problems meant they came a disappointing fourth behind the Joest and Brun Porsche teams. Unsurprisingly, given their dominance, Sauber took the top four places in the Drivers' Championship, with honours going to team-leader Jean-Louis Schlesser. Dickens joined Kunimitsu Takahashi (he of the smouldering Kremer Porsche) to win the latter's fourth All-Japan Group C title with the Nova Engineering Porsche team. Things came right, in the end, for the unlucky Chamberlain Engineering team, when Nick Adams and Fermin Velez won the final C2 Teams and Drivers championships.

This race would mark the end of an era. The ACO had serious concerns at the top speeds now being achieved – with both WM and Sauber reaching 400 kp/h (250 mph). In December, the FIA passed new regulations restricting a race-circuit to having no straights longer than two kilometres. So moves were made to install two chicanes on the Mulsanne Straight breaking up what had been the longest straight in motor-racing into three portions and limit the time cars would be at top speed. The prospects for the new regulations were very unsettling. There were very real worries that engines used in the new "sprint-format" races would not be able to last a full 24 hours, and make a mockery of the Le Mans race. The cost to engineer such reliability could well prove prohibitively expensive for even the biggest manufacturers.

== Official results ==
=== Finishers ===
Results taken from Quentin Spurring's book, officially licensed by the ACO
Class Winners are in Bold text.

Pos	Class	No.	Team	Drivers	Chassis	Engine	Tyre	Laps
1	**Gr.C1**	**63**	**(Switzerland) Team Sauber Mercedes**	**(West Germany) Jochen Mass** **(West Germany) Manuel Reuter** **(Sweden) Stanley Dickens**	Sauber C9	Mercedes-Benz M119; 5.0L V8 twin turbo	M	389
2	Gr.C1	61	**(Switzerland)** Team Sauber Mercedes	(Italy) Mauro Baldi (United Kingdom) Kenny Acheson (Italy) Gianfranco Brancatelli	Sauber C9	Mercedes-Benz M119; 5.0L V8 twin turbo	M	385
3	Gr.C1	9	(West Germany) Joest Racing	(West Germany) Hans-Joachim Stuck (France) Bob Wollek	Porsche 962C	Porsche 935/82 3.0L F6 twin turbo	G	383
4	Gr.C1	1	(United Kingdom) Silk Cut Jaguar Team (United Kingdom) Tom Walkinshaw Racing	(Netherlands) Jan Lammers (France) Patrick Tambay (United Kingdom) Andrew Gilbert-Scott	Jaguar XJR-9LM	Jaguar 7.0L V12	D	381
5	Gr.C1	62	**(Switzerland)** Team Sauber Mercedes	(France) Jean-Louis Schlesser (France) Jean-Pierre Jabouille (France) Alain Cudini	Sauber C9	Mercedes-Benz M119; 5.0L V8 twin turbo	M	379
6	Gr.C1	8	(West Germany) Joest Racing	(France) Henri Pescarolo (France) Claude Ballot-Léna (France) Jean-Louis Ricci	Porsche 962C	Porsche 935/82 3.0L F6 twin turbo	G	372
7	**IMSA**; **GTP**	**201**	**(Japan) Mazdaspeed**	**(Republic of Ireland) David Kennedy** **(Belgium) Pierre Dieudonné** **(United Kingdom) Chris Hodgetts**	Mazda 767B	Mazda 13J-M 2.6L quad-rotary	D	369
8	Gr.C1	4	(United Kingdom) Silk Cut Jaguar Team (United Kingdom) Tom Walkinshaw Racing	(France) Alain Ferté (France) Michel Ferté (Chile) Eliseo Salazar	Jaguar XJR-9LM	Jaguar 7.0L V12	D	369
9	IMSA; GTP	202	(Japan) Mazdaspeed	(Japan) Takashi Yorino (Belgium) Hervé Regout (United States) Elliot Forbes-Robinson	Mazda 767B	Mazda 13J-M 2.6L quad-rotary	D	366
10	Gr.C1	16	(Switzerland) Repsol Brun Motorsport	(Norway) Harald Huysman (West Germany) Uwe Schäfer (France) Dominique Lacaud	Porsche 962C	Porsche 935/82 3.0L F6 twin turbo	Y	352
11	Gr.C1	18	(United Kingdom) Aston Martin (United Kingdom) Ecurie Ecosse	(United Kingdom) Brian Redman (Republic of Ireland) Michael Roe (Greece) Costas Los	Aston Martin AMR1	Aston Martin RDP87 6.0L V8	G	340
12	IMSA; GTP	203	(Japan) Mazdaspeed	(Japan) Yojiro Terada (Belgium) Marc Duez (West Germany) Volker Weidler	Mazda 767	Mazda 13J-4M 2.6L quad-rotary	D	340
13	Gr.C1	55	(Australia) Omron Racing Team Schuppan	(Australia) Vern Schuppan (Sweden) Eje Elgh (Australia) Gary Brabham	Porsche 962C	Porsche 935/82 3.0L F6 twin turbo	D	322
14	**Gr.C2**	113	(France) Courage Compétition	(France) Jean-Claude Andruet (France) Philippe Farjon (Japan) Shunji Kasuya	Cougar C20B	Porsche 935 2.8L F6 turbo	G	313
15	Gr.C1	20	(United Kingdom) Team Davey (private entrant)	(United Kingdom) Tim Lee-Davey (United Kingdom) Tom Dodd-Noble (Japan) Katsunori Iketani	Porsche 962C	Porsche 935/82 3.0L F6 twin turbo	D	309
16	Gr.C2	171	(United Kingdom) Team Mako (private entrant)	(United Kingdom) Don Shead (Canada) Robbie Stirling (United Kingdom) Ross Hyett	Spice-Fiero SE88C	Cosworth DFL 3.3L V8	G	307
17	Gr.C2	108	(United Kingdom) GP Motorsport (United Kingdom) Roy Baker Racing	(United Kingdom) Dudley Wood (United Kingdom) Evan Clements (France) Philippe de Henning	Spice-Fiero SE87C	Cosworth DFL 3.3L V8	G	304
18	Gr.C2	126	France Prototeam (United Kingdom) J. Messaoudi (private entrant)	(France) Jean Messaoudi (France) Pierre-François Rousselot (France) Thierry Lecerf	Argo JM19C	Cosworth DFL 3.3L V8	G	298
19	Gr.C2	104	(France) Graff Racing; Spice Engineering	(France) Jean-Philippe Grand (France) Rémy Pochauvin (France) Jean-Luc Roy	Spice SE89C	Cosworth DFL 3.3L V8	G	292

=== Did not finish ===
Pos	Class	No	Team	Drivers	Chassis	Engine	Tyre	Laps	Reason
DNF	Gr.C1	14	(United Kingdom) Richard Lloyd Racing	(United Kingdom) Derek Bell (United Kingdom) James Weaver (United Kingdom) Tiff Needell	Porsche 962C GTi	Porsche 935/82 3.0L F6 twin turbo	G	339	Fire (23hr)
DNF	Gr.C1	10	(West Germany) Porsche Kremer Racing	(Japan) Kunimitsu Takahashi (Italy) Bruno Giacomelli (Italy) Giovanni Lavaggi	Porsche 962C-K6	Porsche 935/82 3.0L F6 twin turbo	Y	303	Fire (21hr)
DNF	Gr.C1	25	(Japan) Nissan Motorsports; International	(Australia) Geoff Brabham (United States) Chip Robinson (Netherlands) Arie Luyendyk	Nissan R89C	Nissan VRH35Z 3.5L V8 twin turbo	D	250	Engine (17hr)
DNF	Gr.C2	101	(United Kingdom) Chamberlain Engineering	(United Kingdom) Nick Adams (Spain) Fermín Velez (Italy) Luigi Taverna	Spice SE89C	Cosworth DFL 3.3L V8	G	244	Engine (17hr)
DNF	Gr.C1	17	(Switzerland) Repsol Brun Motorsport	(Argentina) Oscar Larrauri (Switzerland) Walter Brun (Spain) Jesús Pareja	Porsche 962C	Porsche 935/82 3.0L F6 twin turbo	Y	242	Engine (16hr)
DNF	Gr.C1	21	(United Kingdom) Spice Engineering	(United Kingdom) Gordon Spice (United Kingdom) Ray Bellm (United States) Lyn St. James	Spice SE89C	Cosworth DFZ 3.5L V8	G	229	Engine (16hr)
DNF	Gr.C1	15	(United Kingdom) Richard Lloyd Racing	(United Kingdom) David Hobbs (United Kingdom) Damon Hill (Sweden) Steven Andskär	Porsche 962C GTi	Porsche 935/82 3.0L F6 twin turbo	G	228	Engine (16hr)
DNF	Gr.C1	32	(France) Courage Compétition (Japan) Team LeMans Co	(Japan) Takao Wada (Japan) Akio Morimoto (Sweden) Anders Olofsson	March 88S (“Cougar R89V”)	Nissan VG30 3.0L V6 twin turbo	Y	221	Engine (16hr)
DNF	Gr.C1	2	(United Kingdom) Silk Cut Jaguar Team (United Kingdom) Tom Walkinshaw Racing	(Denmark) John Nielsen (United Kingdom) Andy Wallace (United States) Price Cobb	Jaguar XJR-9LM	Jaguar 7.0L V12	D	215	Engine (15hr)
DNF	Gr.C2	106	(Italy) Porto Kaleo	(United Kingdom) Robin Smith (Italy) Vito Veninata (Italy) "Stingbrace" (Stefano Sebastiani)	Tiga GC288/9	Cosworth DFL 3.3L V8	G	194	Electrics (17hr)
DNF	Gr.C1	34	(France) Porsche Alméras Montpelier	(France) Jacques Alméras (France) Jean-Marie Alméras (France) Alain Ianetta	Porsche 962C	Porsche 935/82 3.0L F6 twin turbo	G	188	Accident (14hr)
DNF	Gr.C1	12	(France) Courage Compétition	(France) Patrick Gonin (Belgium) Bernard de Dryver (Switzerland) Bernard Santal	Cougar C22	Porsche 935/82 3.0L F6 twin turbo	G	168	Electronics (14hr)
DNF	Gr.C1	23	(Japan) Nissan Motorsports; International	(Japan) Masahiro Hasemi (Japan) Kazuyoshi Hoshino (Japan) Toshio Suzuki	Nissan R89C	Nissan VRH35Z 3.5L V8 twin turbo	D	167	Engine (11hr)
DNF	Gr.C1	19	(United Kingdom) Aston Martin (United Kingdom) Ecurie Ecosse	(United Kingdom) David Leslie (United Kingdom) Ray Mallock (United Kingdom) David Sears	Aston Martin AMR1	Aston Martin RDP87 6.0L V8	G	153	Electrics (11hr)
DNF	Gr.C1	22	(United Kingdom) Spice Engineering	(Denmark) Thorkild Thyrring (South Africa) Wayne Taylor (United Kingdom) Tim Harvey	Spice SE89C	Cosworth DFZ 3.5L V8	G	150	Engine (16hr)
DNF	Gr.C2	103	France Prototeam	(France) Pierre de Thoisy (France) Raymond Touroul (Switzerland) Bernard Thuner	Spice-Fiero SE88C	Cosworth DFL 3.3L V8	G	133	Chassis (13hr)
DNF	Gr.C2	107	(United Kingdom) Tiga Race Team	(Morocco) Max Cohen-Olivar (United Kingdom) John Sheldon (United Kingdom) Robin Donovan	Tiga GC289	Cosworth DFL 3.3L V8	G	126	Transmission (14hr)
DNF	Gr.C1	7	(West Germany) Joest Racing	(West Germany) Frank Jelinski (France) Pierre-Henri Raphanel (West Germany) "John Winter" (Louis Krages)	Porsche 962C	Porsche 935/82 3.0L F6 twin turbo	G	124	Water leak (8hr)
DNF	Gr.C1	13	(France) Courage Compétition	(France) Pascal Fabre (France) Jean-Louis Bousquet (Japan) Jiro Yoneyama	Cougar C22	Porsche 935/82 3.0L F6 twin turbo	G	110	Engine (10hr)
DNF	Gr.C1	52	(France) WM Secateva	(France) Jean-Daniel Raulet (France) Philippe Gache (France) Pascal Pessiot	WM P489	Peugeot PRV ZNS4 3.0L; V6 twin-turbo	M	110	Fire (21hr)
DNF	Gr.C2	102	(United Kingdom) Chamberlain Engineering	(United States) John Hotchkis (United States) John Hotchkis Jr (United Kingdom) Richard Jones	Spice-Fiero SE86C	Hart 418T 1873cc S4 turbo	G	86	Oil leak (10hr)
DNF	Gr.C1	3	(United Kingdom) Silk Cut Jaguar Team (United Kingdom) Tom Walkinshaw Racing	(United States) Davy Jones (Republic of Ireland) Derek Daly (United States) Jeff Kline	Jaguar XJR-9LM	Jaguar 7.0L V12	D	85	Engine (6hr)
DNF	Gr.C1	27	(Switzerland) Repsol Brun Motorsport	(West Germany) Rudi Seher (Austria) Franz Konrad (Spain) Andrés Vilariño	Porsche 962C	Porsche 935/82 3.0L F6 twin turbo	Y	81	Engine (6hr)
DNF	Gr.C1	5	(Switzerland) Repsol Brun Motorsport (Japan) From A Racing	(West Germany) Harald Grohs (South Africa) Sarel van der Merwe (Japan) Akihiko Nakaya	Porsche 962C	Porsche 935/82 3.0L F6 twin turbo	Y	78	Gearbox (7hr)
DNF	Gr.C2	177	(France) Automobiles Louis Descartes (private entrant)	(France) Louis Descartes (France) Alain Serpaggi (France) Yves Hervalet	ALD C289	Cosworth DFL 3.3L V8	G	75	Radiator (10hr)
DNF	Gr.C1	33	(Australia) Racing Team Schuppan Takefuji	(United Kingdom) Will Hoy (France) Jean Alesi (West Germany) / (United States) Dominic Dobson	Porsche 962C	Porsche 935/82 3.0L F6 twin turbo	D	69	Fire (5hr)
DNF	Gr.C1	72	(West Germany) Obermaier Racing (France) Primagaz Compétition	(West Germany) Jürgen Lässig (France) Pierre Yver (France) Paul Belmondo	Porsche 962C	Porsche 935/79 2.8L F6 twin turbo	G	61	Accident (5hr)
DNF	Gr.C1	37	(Japan) Toyota Team TOM'S	(United Kingdom) Geoff Lees (United Kingdom) Johnny, Earl Dumfries (United Kingdom) John Watson	Toyota 89C-V	Toyota R32V 3.2L V8 twin turbo	B	58	Accident (6hr)
DNF	Gr.C2	151	(Switzerland) P.-A. Lombardi (private entrant)	(Switzerland) Pierre-Alain Lombardi (France) Bruno Sotty (Italy) Fabio Magnani	Spice-Fiero SE86C	Cosworth DFL 3.3L V8	G	58	Suspension (5hr)
DNF	Gr.C1	6	(Switzerland) Repsol Brun Motorsport (Japan) Alpha Nova Racing	(Brazil) Maurizio Sandro Sala (Austria) Roland Ratzenberger (Austria) Walter Lechner	Porsche 962C	Porsche 935/82 3.0L F6 twin turbo	Y	58	Suspension (4hr)
DNF	Gr.C1	36	(Japan) Toyota Team TOM'S	(Japan) Hitoshi Ogawa (Italy) Paolo Barilla (United States) Ross Cheever	Toyota 89C-V	Toyota R32V 3.2L V8 twin turbo	B	45	Engine (4hr)
DNF	Gr.C1	11	(West Germany) Porsche Kremer Racing	(South Africa) George Fouché (Japan) Masanori Sekiya (Japan) Hideki Okada	Porsche 962C-K6	Porsche 935/82 3.0L F6 twin turbo	Y	42	Accident (4hr)
DNF	Gr.C2	105	(Italy) Porto Kaleo	(France) Noël del Bello (France) Jean-Claude Justice (France) Jean-Claude Ferrarin	Tiga GC288/9	Cosworth DFL 3.3L V8	G	36	Engine (5hr)
DNF	Gr.C1	38	(Japan) Toyota Team TOM'S	(Japan) Kaoru Hoshino (France) Didier Artzet (Japan) Keiichi Suzuki	Toyota 88C	Toyota 3S-GTM 2.1L S4 turbo	B	20	Accident (3hr)
DNF	Gr.C2	175	(United Kingdom) ADA Engineering	(United Kingdom) Ian Harrower (United Kingdom) Laurence Bristow (United Kingdom) Colin Pool	ADA 02B	Cosworth DFL 3.3L V8	G	14	Electrics (7hr)
DNF	Gr.C1	24	(Japan) Nissan Motorsports; International	(United Kingdom) Julian Bailey (United Kingdom) Mark Blundell (United Kingdom) Martin Donnelly	Nissan R89C	Nissan VRH35Z 3.5L V8 twin turbo	D	5	Accident (1hr)

=== Did not start ===
Pos	Class	No	Team	Drivers	Chassis	Engine	Tyre	Reason
DNS	Gr.C1	51	(France) WM Secateva	(France) Roger Dorchy (France) Michel Maisonneuve	WM P489	Peugeot PRV ZNS4 3.0L; V6 twin-turbo	M	Fire
DNQ	Gr.C1	29	(Italy) Mussato Action Car	(Italy) Almo Coppelli (Italy) Franco Scapini (Austria) Ernst Franzmaier	Lancia LC2	Ferrari 308C 3.1L V8 twin turbo	D	Fire
DNQ	Gr.C2	176	(France) Automobiles Louis Descartes (private entrant)	(France) Thierry Serfaty (France) Sylvain Boulay (France) “Batmalle“ (William Batmalle)	ALD 04	BMW M88 3.5L S6	G	Did not qualify
DNQ	Gr.C2	178	(France) D. Bonnet (private entrant)	(France) Didier Bonnet (France) Gérard Tremblay (France) Gérard Cuynet	ALD 05	BMW M88 3.5L S6	A	Did not qualify
DNQ	Gr.C2	179	(France) D. Bonnet (private entrant)	(France) Jean-Luc Colin (France) François Cardon (France) Yves Bey-Rozet	ALD 06	BMW M88 3.5L S6	G	Did not qualify
DNA	Gr.C1	17	(West Germany) Jochen Dauer Racing (private entrant)	(West Germany) Jochen Dauer (Austria) Franz Konrad	Porsche 962C	Porsche ... L F6 twin turbo		Did not arrive
DNA	Gr.C1	40	(Switzerland) Swiss Team Salamin (private entrant)	(Switzerland) Antoine Salamin (Morocco) Max Cohen-Olivar	Porsche 962C	Porsche 935/82 3.0L F6 twin turbo		Did not arrive
DNA	Gr.C2	111	(United Kingdom) PC Automotive (private entrant)	(United Kingdom) Richard Piper (United States) Olindo Iacobelli (France) Alain Ianetta	Spice-Fiero SE88C	Cosworth DFL 3.3 L V8	G	Did not arrive
Res	Gr.C1		(France) N. del Bello (private entrant)	(France) Noël del Bello	Sauber C8	Mercedes-Benz M117; 5.0L V8 twin turbo		Not required
Res	Gr.C2		(United Kingdom) Roy Baker Racing	(United Kingdom) Duncan Bain (United States) Steve Hynes (Morocco) Max Cohen-Olivar	Tiga GC289	Cosworth DFL 3.3 L V8		Not required

=== Class winners ===
Class	Winning car	Winning drivers
Group C1	#63 Sauber C9	Mass / Reuter / Dickens
Group C2	#113 Cougar C20LM	Andruet / Farjon / Kasuya
IMSA-GTP	#201 Mazda 767B	Dieudonné / Kennedy / Hodgetts *
Note *: setting a new class distance record.

=== Challenge Econergie ===
Pos	Class	No	Team	Drivers	Chassis	Score
1	Gr.C2	104	(France) Graff Racing; Spice Engineering	(France) Jean-Philippe Grand (France) Rémy Pochauvin (France) Jean-Luc Roy	Spice SE89C	4.621
2	Gr.C1	61	**(Switzerland)** Team Sauber Mercedes	(Italy) Mauro Baldi (United Kingdom) Kenny Acheson (Italy) Gianfranco Brancatelli	Sauber C9	3.101
3	Gr.C1	62	**(Switzerland)** Team Sauber Mercedes	(France) Jean-Louis Schlesser (France) Jean-Pierre Jabouille (France) Alain Cudini	Sauber C9	3.088
4	Gr.C2	171	(United Kingdom) Team Mako (private entrant)	(United Kingdom) Don Shead (Canada) Robbie Stirling (United Kingdom) Ross Hyett	Spice-Fiero SE88C	2.987
5	Gr.C1	9	(West Germany) Joest Racing	(West Germany) Hans-Joachim Stuck (France) Bob Wollek	Porsche 962C	2.949
6	Gr.C1	63	**(Switzerland)** Team Sauber Mercedes	(West Germany) Jochen Mass (West Germany) Manuel Reuter (Sweden) Stanley Dickens	Sauber C9	1.698
7	Gr.C1	4	(United Kingdom) Silk Cut Jaguar Team (United Kingdom) Tom Walkinshaw Racing	(France) Alain Ferté (France) Michel Ferté (Chile) Eliseo Salazar	Jaguar XJR-9LM	1.304
8	Gr.C1	18	(United Kingdom) Aston Martin (United Kingdom) Ecurie Ecosse	(United Kingdom) Brian Redman (Republic of Ireland) Michael Roe (Greece) Costas Los	Aston Martin AMR1	0.776
9	Gr.C1	1	(United Kingdom) Silk Cut Jaguar Team (United Kingdom) Tom Walkinshaw Racing	(Netherlands) Jan Lammers (France) Patrick Tambay (United Kingdom) Andrew Gilbert-Scott	Jaguar XJR-9LM	0.726
10	IMSA; GTP	201	(Japan) Mazdaspeed	(Republic of Ireland) David Kennedy (Belgium) Pierre Dieudonné (United Kingdom) Chris Hodgetts	Mazda 767B	-1.043

- Note: Only the top ten positions are included in this set of standings.

=== Statistics ===
Taken from Quentin Spurring's book, officially licensed by the ACO

- Pole Position – J.-L. Schlesser, #62 Sauber C9 - 3:15.0secs; 249.9 km/h (155.3 mph)
- Fastest Lap – A. Ferté, #4 Jaguar XJR-9LM– 3:21.1secs; 242.1 km/h (150.4 mph)
- Winning Distance – 5,265.12 km (3,271.59 mi)
- Winner's Average Speed – 220.0 km/h (136.7 mph)
- Attendance – 230,000
