= Roland Ratzenberger =

Austrian racing driver (1960–1994)

- Ratzenberger at the 1994 Brazilian Grand Prix
- Born: Roland Walter Ratzenberger; 4 July 1960; Salzburg, Austria
- Died: 30 April 1994 (aged 33); Bologna, Emilia-Romagna, Italy
- Cause of death: Injuries sustained at the 1994 San Marino Grand Prix
- Spouse: Bente (m. 1991; div. 1992)

Formula One World Championship career
- Nationality: (Austria) Austrian
- Active years: 1994
- Team: Simtek
- Entries: 3 (1 start)
- Championships: 0
- Wins: 0
- Podiums: 0
- Career points: 0
- Pole positions: 0
- Fastest laps: 0
- First entry: 1994 Brazilian Grand Prix
- Last entry: 1994 San Marino Grand Prix

24 Hours of Le Mans career
- Years: 1989–1993
- Teams: Brun, Toyota, Porsche, SARD
- Best finish: 5th (1993)
- Class wins: 1 (1993)

Roland Walter Ratzenberger (German: [ˈroːlant ˈratsn̩bɛrɡɐ]; 4 July 1960 – 30 April 1994) was an Austrian racing driver, who competed in Formula One at three Grands Prix in 1994.

Born and raised in Salzburg, Ratzenberger began his racing career as a protégé of Walter Lechner, joining the Lechner Racing School at the Salzburgring upon graduating from technical school, aged 18. Ratzenberger progressed to Formula Ford in 1983, winning multiple national and continental titles, as well as the Festival in 1986. Ratzenberger balanced his next two seasons between touring car racing and Formula Three; he contested the World Touring Car Championship in 1987 with Schnitzer, achieving four podium finishes in ten races whilst driving the BMW E30 M3. After finishing third in the 1989 British Formula 3000 Championship and retiring from his 24 Hours of Le Mans debut, Ratzenberger moved into Japanese motorsport with Toyota. Amongst competing in World Sportscar, All-Japan Sports Prototype, Japanese Touring Car and Japanese Formula 3000, Ratzenberger also entered four further editions of Le Mans from 1990 to 1993, winning the C2 class at the latter in the Toyota 93C-V with SARD.

Ratzenberger signed for Simtek in 1994, making his Formula One debut at the Brazilian Grand Prix, where he did not qualify. He made his only Grand Prix start at the subsequent Pacific Grand Prix, finishing 11th after starting 26th. During qualifying for the San Marino Grand Prix at Imola, Ratzenberger died as the result of a basilar skull fracture sustained in an accident at the Villeneuve Curva, colliding with a concrete barrier at 225 km/h (140 mph) in his Simtek S941. He was the first fatality in the Formula One World Championship since Riccardo Paletti in 1982. The weekend became notorious for the fatal accident of Ayrton Senna the following day, with both deaths leading to widespread safety reforms and the re-establishment of the Grand Prix Drivers' Association.

== Early and personal life ==
Roland Walter Ratzenberger was born in Salzburg, Austria, on 4 July 1960. When he was seven, his grandmother took him to a local hillclimb race at Gaisberg. Ιn 1969, the Salzburgring opened near his home. As a teenager, he discovered that racer and Formula Ford team owner Walter Lechner was based nearby and, while studying at a technical school, began to hang around the workshop. On finishing his education at eighteen, he joined Lechner, who was at this time opening a racing school at the Salzburgring.

In the winter of 1991, in Monaco, and after what Adam Cooper described as "a whirlwind courtship", Ratzenberger married the former partner of another driver, becoming stepfather to her son from a previous relationship. They were divorced early in 1992.

== Career ==
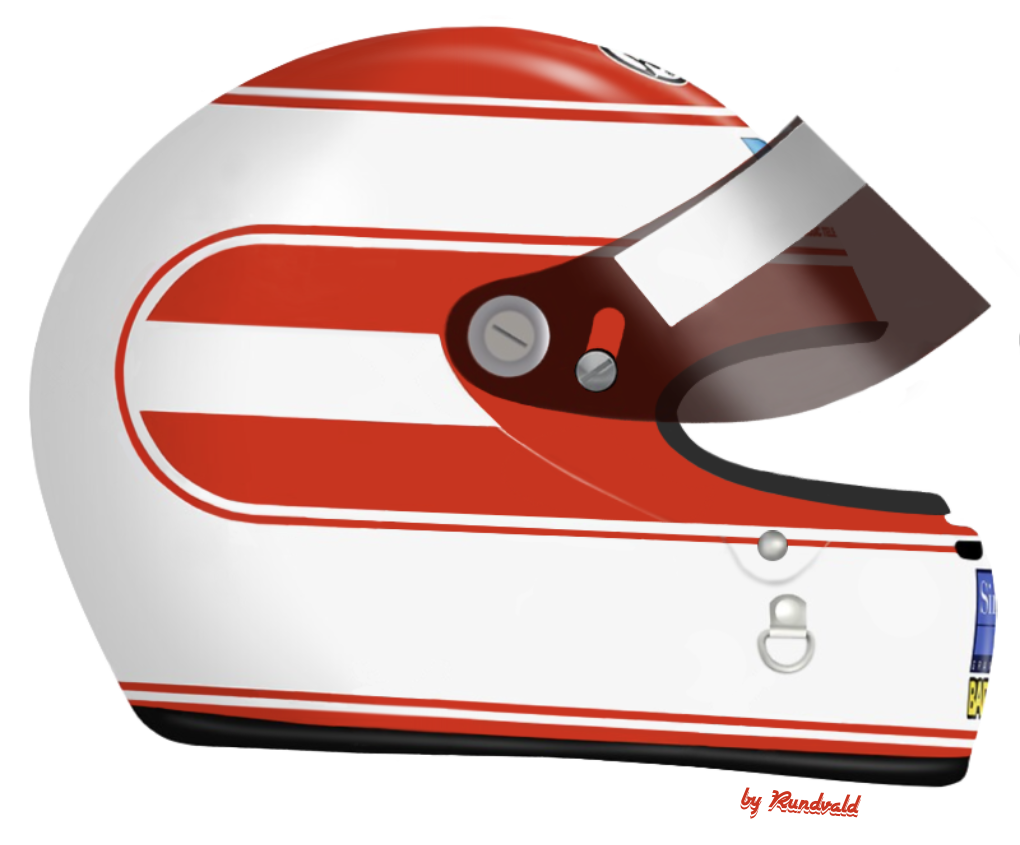
Roland Ratzenberger's helmet.

Ratzenberger began racing in German Formula Ford in 1983, and in 1985 won both the Austrian and Central European Formula Ford championships. In 1985, he entered the Formula Ford Festival at Brands Hatch in England, finishing second. He returned in 1986 to win the event, before graduating to British Formula 3 the following season. While in the UK, he briefly gained fame for the similarity of his name to that of TV puppet Roland Rat, with whom he appeared in an edition of TV-am; the TV-am branding appeared for a time on his car.

Two years in British F3 yielded two 12th places in the championship with West Surrey Racing and Madgwick Motorsport. Ratzenberger also raced in other cars besides single seaters, once finishing second in the 1987 World Touring Car Championship driving a Team Schnitzer BMW M3. In 1988, he entered the final few rounds of the British Touring Car Championship in a class B BMW M3, racing for the Demon Tweeks team. The next year, he entered the British Formula 3000 series, finishing third overall, and also raced in the Le Mans 24 Hours for the first time; the Brun Motorsport, Porsche 962 he shared with Maurizio Sandro Sala and Walter Lechner retired in the third hour. He would take part in the next four Le Mans races, with Brun again in 1991, and with the SARD team in 1990, 1992 and 1993.

In the 1990s, Ratzenberger began racing primarily in Japan. He won one race each in 1990 and 1991 in the Japanese Sports Prototype Championship with the same SARD team he drove for at Le Mans. He also returned to touring car racing in the Japanese Touring Car Championship, finishing seventh in 1990 and 1991 in a BMW M3. During the latter year, Ratzenberger tested a CART Lola T91/00 for Dick Simon Racing at Willow Springs.

This paved the way for a return to Formula 3000 in the Japanese championship, with the Stellar team in the 1992 season. His year began poorly but, when the team upgraded their two-year-old Lola for a new model, Ratzenberger won once to finish seventh overall. He remained in the series in 1993, finishing 11th. That year, he achieved his highest finish at Le Mans, as he, Mauro Martini, and Naoki Nagasaka finished fifth in a Toyota 93 C-V.

=== Formula One ===
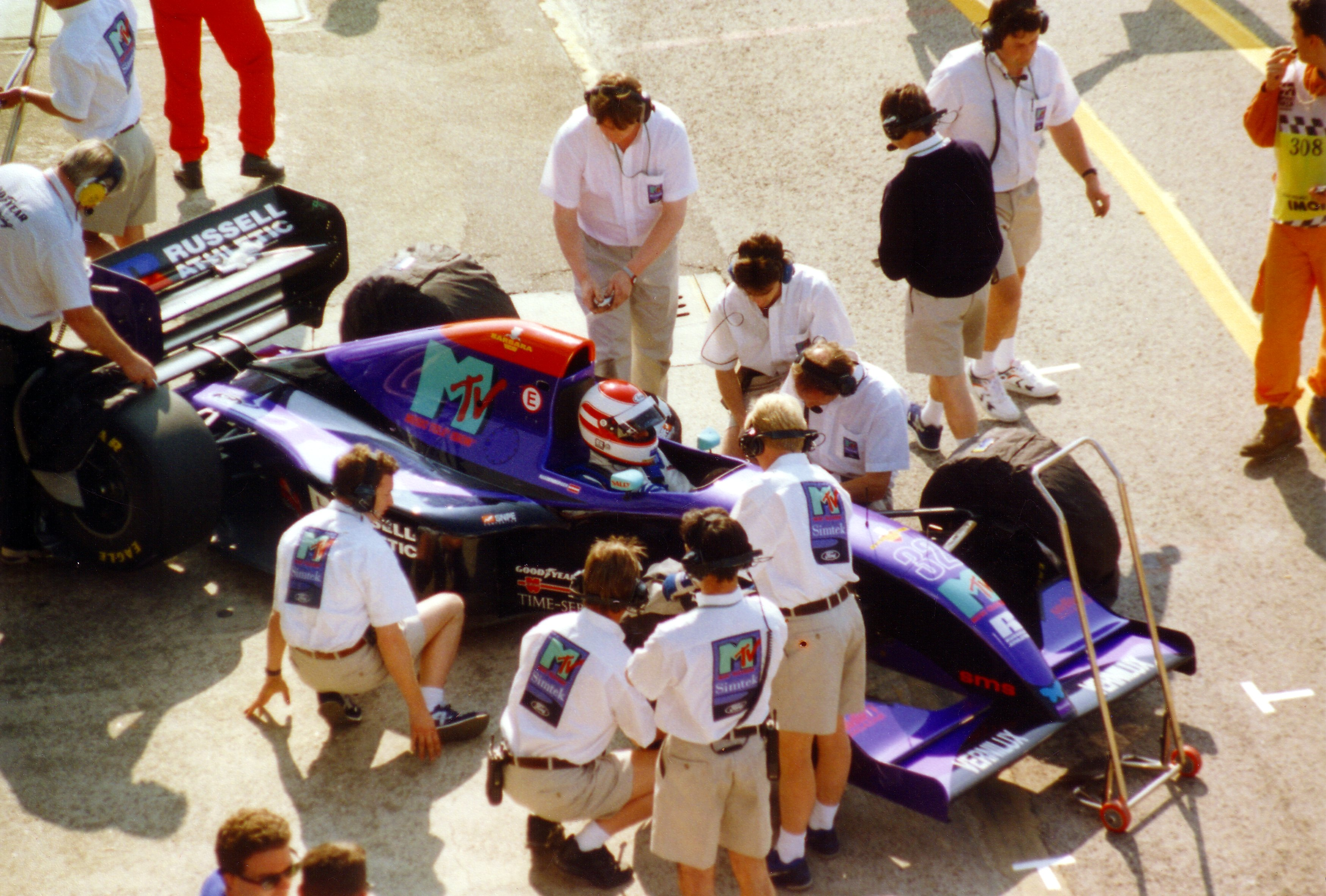
Roland Ratzenberger on his last day (30 April 1994) at Imola during the San Marino Grand Prix. Later that day, Ratzenberger was killed during qualifying.

Ratzenberger greatly desired to race in Formula One, especially as former rivals in F3000, such as Eddie Irvine and Johnny Herbert, had managed to reach the top level while he had not. He came very close to securing a drive with the Jordan team for their inaugural season in 1991. Negotiations were at a very advanced stage when Ratzenberger lost the financial support of a "major sponsor". In the end, Bertrand Gachot got the seat.

In 1994, Ratzenberger achieved his ambition of becoming one of the few Austrian Formula One drivers. After gaining a sponsor in a wealthy German, Barbara Behlau, who negotiated a deal over the 1993–1994 winter, Ratzenberger signed a five-race deal with the new Simtek team, partnering David Brabham. With a very uncompetitive car, Ratzenberger failed to qualify for the first race at Interlagos. However, the next round at the TI Circuit in Aida went much better, as he not only managed to qualify, but finish in a very commendable eleventh place, even considering that he was the only driver who had raced at the venue before.

== Death ==
=== Crash ===
The San Marino Grand Prix at Imola would have been Ratzenberger's third race in Formula One. During the first qualifying session on Friday 29 April, he asked the more experienced Brabham to test his car out; the Australian vindicated Ratzenberger's assessment of the brakes, which had been troubling him at the previous races. According to Brabham, the issue was soon resolved to the satisfaction of both. The session was overshadowed when Jordan driver Rubens Barrichello hit a kerb at the Variante Bassa corner; his car, travelling at 225 km/h (140 mph), was sent airborne, and collided with the tyre barrier. Having received injuries to his nose and arm, Barrichello was transferred to a nearby hospital, and took no further part in the weekend.

The next day, the second qualifying session proceeded as normal until the moment of his accident. Early in the session, Ratzenberger went off the track at the Acque Minerali chicane. With his sponsor in attendance for the first time, and at the halfway point of his contract, he decided to carry on, after checking the car to the best of his abilities. Unknown to him, the minor incident had damaged his front wing; on a later lap, as he tried to turn into the high-downforce Villeneuve corner, the wing broke and became lodged under the car, which crashed into the outside wall at 314.9 km/h (195.7 mph).

Ratzenberger was transferred by ambulance to Imola Circuit's medical centre, then by air ambulance to the Maggiore Hospital in Bologna where he was pronounced dead upon arrival. He had suffered three individually fatal injuries: a basilar skull fracture, which was named as the official cause of death; blunt trauma from the front-left tyre penetrating the survival cell; and a ruptured aorta. Ratzenberger was the first racing driver to lose his life at a Grand Prix weekend since the 1982 season, when Riccardo Paletti was killed at the Canadian Grand Prix. Ratzenberger was also the first driver to die as a result of a crash in a Formula One car since Elio de Angelis during testing for the 1986 season. He was also the first Austrian driver to die as a result of a crash during qualifying in a Formula One car since Jochen Rindt in the 1970 season.

Villeneuve Curva, the location of Ratzenberger's fatal crash. Ayrton Senna was killed the next day at the previous bend.

Bernie Ecclestone personally delivered the confirmation of Ratzenberger's death to the stunned Simtek team. Grieving, Brabham made the decision to compete on Sunday:

Everyone was in a state of shock. Nobody could comprehend what had happened ... I don't remember much until the evening when the team sat me down and told me that the decision was up to me whether we continued to race ... I thought I have to pick this team up and continue what we're doing. I decided to race, really for the guys.

Ayrton Senna commandeered an official car to hurry to the medical center; he learnt of Ratzenberger's death from friend and neurosurgeon Sid Watkins. Watkins suggested to the inconsolable Senna that he withdraw from the following day's race and go fishing instead, and asked him if he wanted to stop racing. Senna famously responded "I cannot quit, I have to go on," and, having returned to his garage, decided to withdraw for the remainder of qualifying.

Ratzenberger's spot on the starting grid was left empty. Paul Belmondo was reported to have been offered the final position on the grid but declined, out of respect for Ratzenberger and on the grounds that he had not earned that race spot.

=== Race and aftermath ===
During the seventh lap of the race the following day, Senna's car ran wide at the Tamburello left-hander and struck an unprotected concrete barrier at 233 km/h (140 mph), resulting in multiple fatal injuries. When track officials examined the wreckage of Senna's racing car, they found a furled Austrian flag. Senna had planned to raise it after the race, in honour of Ratzenberger. The race was won by Michael Schumacher, with Nicola Larini and Mika Häkkinen in second and third positions respectively, while Brabham retired after 27 laps. Out of respect for Ratzenberger and Senna, no champagne was sprayed at the podium ceremony.

The death of Senna, a three-time world champion, mostly overshadowed Ratzenberger's: while all active Formula One drivers attended Senna's funeral, only five (Brabham, Herbert, Heinz-Harald Frentzen, and Ratzenberger's compatriots Karl Wendlinger and Gerhard Berger) attended Ratzenberger's. FIA president Max Mosley was also in attendance, noting in an interview ten years later:

Roland had been forgotten. So, I went to his funeral because everyone went to Senna's. I thought it was important that somebody went to his.

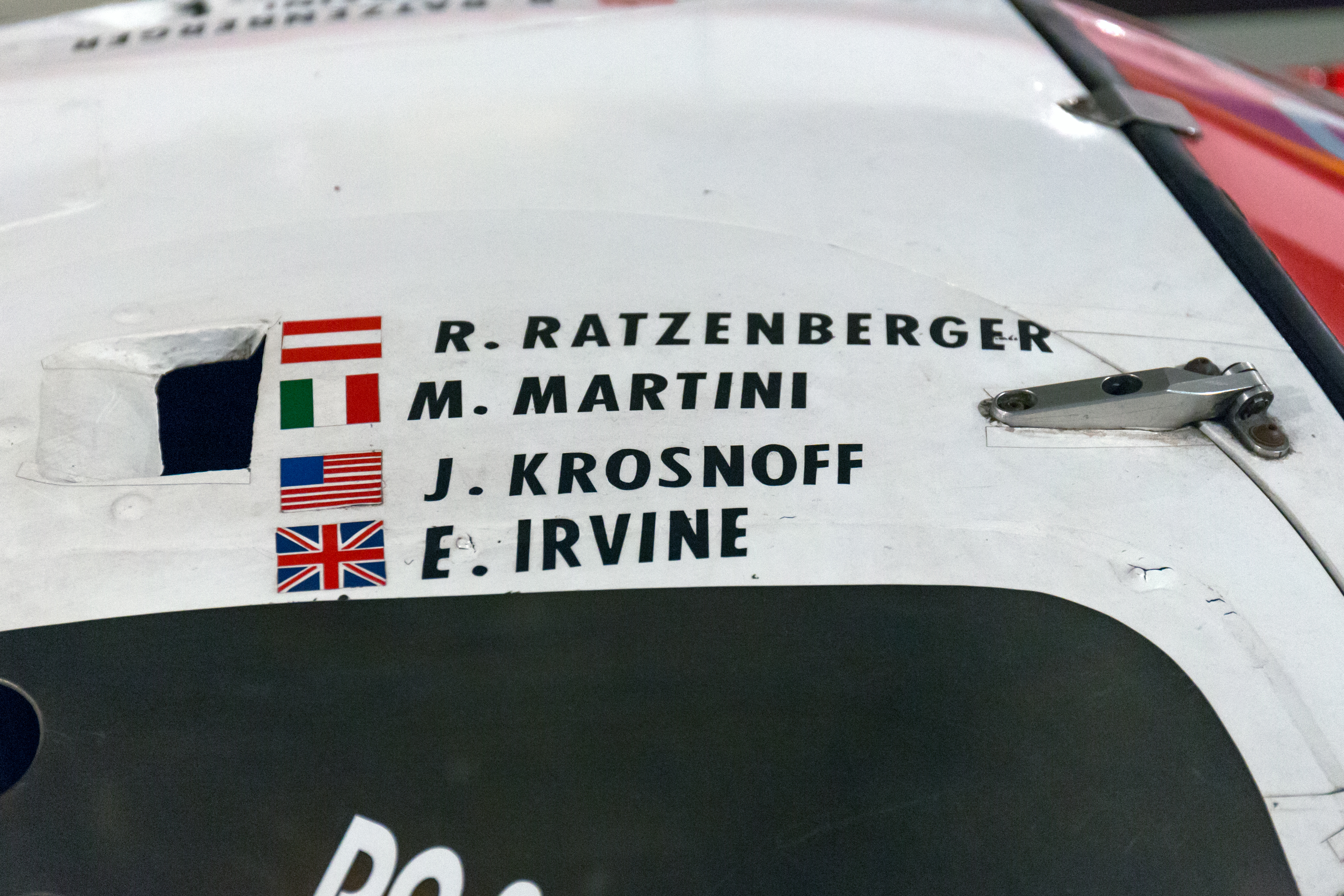
As a tribute, Ratzenberger's name was left on the Toyota 94C-V which he intended to drive at Le Mans.

Ratzenberger was buried in Maxglan, in Salzburg.

At the next race in the F1 calendar, Monaco, the first two grid positions were left empty and painted with Austrian and Brazilian flags, to honor Ratzenberger and Senna, respectively. Due to drive later that year in the Le Mans 24 Hours for Toyota, Ratzenberger's name was left on the car as a tribute, with his friend Eddie Irvine taking his place at the wheel.

=== Legacy ===
During the customary Sunday morning pre-race drivers' briefing, the remaining drivers agreed to the reformation of the Grand Prix Drivers' Association (GPDA), with Senna, Berger and Schumacher intended to be its first directors. The reformed GPDA subsequently pressed for thorough improvements to safety after the Imola crashes and others during 1994; for 2003, the FIA mandated the use of the HANS device, designed to prevent the type of injury suffered by Ratzenberger.

== Racing record ==
=== Career summary ===
Season	Series	Team	Races	Wins	Poles	F/Laps	Podiums	Points	Position
1985	German Formula Ford 1600	Van Diemen	?	?	?	?	?	?	?
1985	Formula Ford Festival	Van Diemen	1	0	0	0	0	N/A	NC
1985	EFDA Euroseries Formula Ford 1600	Van Diemen	1	0	0	0	0	N/A	NC
1986	Esso Formula Ford 1600 Championship		?	?	?	?	?	?	?
1986	Formula Ford 1600 – Ford Race of Champions		1	1	0	0	1	N/A	**1st**
1986	Formula Ford Festival	Van Diemen	1	1	1	0	1	N/A	**1st**
1987	World Touring Car Championship	Schnitzer Motorsport	10	0	1	0	4	146	10th
1987	British Formula Three	West Surrey Racing	9	0	0	0	2	10	12th
1987	Formula 3 Euro Series	West Surrey Racing	2	1	0	1	2	35	5th
1987	European Touring Car Championship	Schnitzer Motorsport	1	0	0	0	0	0	NC
1988	British Formula Three	Madgwick Motorsport	9	0	0	0	0	4	12th
1988	British Touring Car Championship	Demon Tweeks	7	1	0	2	4	26	11th
1989	British Formula 3000	Spirit Motorsport	8	1	3	4	6	37	**3rd**
1989	All-Japan Sports Prototype Championship	Toyota Team SARD	5	0	1	1	0	1	36th
1989	Deutsche Tourenwagen Meisterschaft	Marko RSM	2	0	0	0	0	1	47th
1989	World Sportscar Championship	Toyota Team Tom's	2	0	0	0	0	10	31st
1989	World Sportscar Championship	Repsol Brun Motorsport	2	0	0	0	0	10	31st
1989	24 Hours of Le Mans	Brun Motorsport / Alpha Racing Team	1	0	0	0	0	N/A	DNF
1990	Japanese Touring Car Championship	Auto Tech Racing	6	2	0	0	5	98	7th
1990	All-Japan Sports Prototype Championship	Toyota Team SARD	5	1	0	0	1	38	9th
1990	Japanese Formula 3000	Team Noji International	4	0	0	0	0	NC	0
1990	World Sportscar Championship	Toyota Team Tom's	1	0	0	0	0	NC	0
1990	24 Hours of Le Mans	Toyota Team SARD	1	0	0	0	0	N/A	DNF
1991	All-Japan Sports Prototype Championship	Toyota Team SARD	7	1	1	0	1	27	15th
1991	Japanese Touring Car Championship	Auto Tech Racing	6	3	0	0	5	125	7th
1991	World Sportscar Championship	Team Salamin Primagaz	2	0	0	0	0	0	NC
1992	Japanese Formula 3000	Stellar International	1	1	2	0	2	19	7th
1992	All-Japan Sports Prototype Championship – Class 2	Auto Tech Racing	8	2	0	0	6	85	5th
1992	All-Japan Sports Prototype Championship	Kitz Racing Team w/ SARD	6	0	0	0	1	46	7th
1992	IMSA GT Championship	Team 0123	1	0	0	0	1	23	17th
1993	Japanese Formula 3000	Stellar International	10	0	0	0	1	6	12th
1993	24 Hours of Le Mans	Y's Racing Team / Sard Co. Ltd.	1	0	0	0	0	N/A	5th
1994	Formula One	MTV Simtek Ford	1	0	0	0	0	0	NC

=== Complete World Touring Car Championship results ===
(key) (Races in bold indicate pole position) (Races in italics indicate fastest lap)

Year	Team	Car	1	2	3	4	5	6	7	8	9	10	10	DC	Points
1987	Schnitzer Motorsport	BMW M3	MNZ; DSQ	JAR; 2	DIJ; Ret	NUR; 3	SPA; 6	BNO; 4	SIL; Ret	BAT; Ret	CLD; 3	WEL; 4	FJI	10th	146

=== Complete British Touring Car Championship results ===
(key) (Races in bold indicate pole position – 1982–1990 in class) (Races in italics indicate fastest lap – 1 point awarded ?–1989 in class)

Year	Team	Car	Class	1	2	3	4	5	6	7	8	9	10	11	12	13	DC	Pts	Class
1988	Demon Tweeks	BMW M3	B	SIL	OUL	THR	DON; Ret	THR; 8	SIL; 16	SIL; Ret	BRH	SNE	BRH; 11	BIR; C	DON; 13	SIL; 9	13th	26	4th

=== 24 Hours of Le Mans results ===
Year	Team	Co-drivers	Car	Class	Laps	Pos.	Class Pos.
1989	(Switzerland) Brun Motorsport (Japan) Alpha Racing Team	(Brazil) Maurizio Sandro Sala (Austria) Walter Lechner	Porsche 962C	C1	58	DNF	DNF
1990	(Japan) Toyota Team SARD	(France) Pierre-Henri Raphanel (Japan) Naoki Nagasaka	Toyota 90C-V	C1	241	DNF	DNF
1991	(Switzerland) Team Salamin Primagaz (Australia) Team Schuppan	(Sweden) Eje Elgh (United Kingdom) Will Hoy	Porsche 962C	C2	202	DNF	DNF
1992	(Japan) Toyota Team Tom's (Japan) Kitz Racing Team with SARD	(Sweden) Eje Elgh (United Kingdom) Eddie Irvine	Toyota 92C-V	C2	321	9th	**2nd**
1993	(Japan) Y's Racing Team (Japan) Sard Co. Ltd.	(Italy) Mauro Martini (Japan) Naoki Nagasaka	Toyota 93C-V	C2	363	5th	**1st**

=== Complete British Formula 3000 results ===
(key) (Races in bold indicate pole position; races in italics indicate fastest lap)

Year	Entrant	1	2	3	4	5	6	7	8	9	DC	Pts
1989	Spirit Motorsport	BRH; 2	THR; 2	OUL; 8†	**DON**; 1	**BRH**; 2	SNE; 2	SIL; 3	**OUL**; Ret	BRH	3rd	37

† — Did not finish the race, but was classified as he completed over 90% of the race distance.

=== Complete Japanese Formula 3000 results ===
(key) (Races in bold indicate pole position; races in italics indicate fastest lap)

Year	Entrant	1	2	3	4	5	6	7	8	9	10	11	DC	Points
1990	Team Noji International	SUZ; DNQ	FUJ; Ret	MIN; Ret	SUZ	SUG	FUJ	FUJ; Ret	SUZ; 15	FUJ; DNQ	SUZ		NC	0
1992	Stellar International	SUZ; DNQ	FUJ; 13	MIN; 3	SUZ; Ret	AUT; Ret	SUG; 4	FUJ; Ret	**FUJ**; 4	**SUZ**; 1	FUJ; 25†	SUZ; Ret	7th	19
1993	Stellar International	SUZ; Ret	FUJ; 10	MIN; Ret	SUZ; 6	AUT; C	SUG; 16	FUJ; C	FUJ; 3	SUZ; 6	FUJ; 14	SUZ; 7	12th	6

† Did not finish, but was classified as he had completed more than 90% of the race distance.

=== Complete Formula One results ===
(key)

Year	Entrant	Chassis	Engine	1	2	3	4	5	6	7	8	9	10	11	12	13	14	15	16	WDC	Points
1994	MTV Simtek Ford	Simtek S941	Ford V8	BRA; DNQ	PAC; 11	SMR; DNS	MON	ESP	CAN	FRA	GBR	GER	HUN	BEL	ITA	POR	EUR	JPN	AUS	NC	0

Sporting positions
Preceded by Johnny Herbert	Formula Ford Festival winner 1986	Succeeded by Eddie Irvine
Preceded by Elio de Angelis	Formula One fatal accidents 30 April 1994	Succeeded by Ayrton Senna
