= Andrew Gilbert-Scott =

British racing driver (born 1958)

- Nationality: (United Kingdom) British
- Born: Andrew Michael Gilbert-Scott; 11 July 1958 (age 68); Cookham Dean, England

24 Hours of Le Mans career
- Years: 1989, 1997
- Teams: Silk Cut Jaguar, Gulf Team Davidoff
- Best finish: 4th (1989)
- Class wins: 0

Andrew Michael Gilbert-Scott (born 11 July 1958) is a British former racing driver.

== Early career ==
Gilbert-Scott started his racing career in the Formula Ford British championship in 1981. In 1983, he moved to the Lola Formula Ford works team. Gilbert-Scott was successful, winning the RAC and Townsend Thoresen Championships.

== Career in Europe ==
In 1986, Gilbert-Scott stepped up into Formula Three, and ran for the Chuck McCarthy Racing team, finishing 11th overall. In 1987, he competed in some races in the FIA International Formula 3000 championship, and also entered sports car racing series such as the World Sportscar Championship and the All Japan Sports Prototype Championship.

Disappointed with his lack of progress in Europe, Gilbert-Scott tried to move to Japan in 1988. In this year, he competed in the All-Japan Formula Three Championship and the All Japan Sports Prototype Championship.

In 1989, Gilbert-Scott had further successes in the British Formula 3000 series for the Eddie Jordan Racing team, finishing second overall. He also raced in International Formula 3000 for GA Motorsports. He raced at the 24 Hours of Le Mans as part of the Silk Cut Jaguar team in the Jaguar XJR-9 LM.

In the next two years, Gilbert-Scott continued his competition in the International Formula 3000 championship. He raced for Leyton House Racing in the 1990 season, and made a few appearances for the Roni Motorsport team in the 1991 season. However, he did not score any notable results.

== Move to Japan ==
In 1992, Gilbert-Scott returned to Japan, competing in the All Japan Formula 3000 Championship for the Stellar International racing team, and also drove their BMW M3 car in the All Japan Touring Car Championship. He competed in the same environment until 1997, and also competed in the early years of the Formula Nippon championship, started in 1996. He therefore became a well-known name for Japanese race fans.

In 1997, his last year as a professional racecar driver, Gilbert-Scott also raced at the 24 Hours of Le Mans for the GTC Racing team (Gulf Team Davidoff) and drove a McLaren F1 GTR.

== After his racing driver career ==
In 1998, Gilbert-Scott drove a Jordan Grand Prix Formula One car down the Hangar Straight of Silverstone Circuit in a drag race, competing against a Ferrari F40 road car, as a feature for a Jeremy Clarkson video title "the most outrageous DVD in the world...ever!" He has raced Jordan Grand Prix cars on various other occasions, including again at Silverstone Circuit in 2001. He managed racing driver Takuma Sato from 2001 until 2009.

== Personal life ==
Gilbert-Scott is related to Thomas Scott, rector of Aston Sandford, Buckinghamshire, who wrote the first commentary on the English Bible. He is also a second cousin of Angus William Thomas Gilbert Scott, a world record ultralight aviator, currently living in Hong Kong. He is also descended from the distinguished architects Sir Giles Gilbert Scott and Sir George Gilbert Scott. His mother's side of the family own the Morgan Car Company.

== Racing record ==
=== Complete Formula Nippon Championship results ===
(key) (Races in bold indicate pole position) (Races in italics indicate fastest lap)

Year	Team	1	2	3	4	5	6	7	8	9	10	11	DC	Pts
1989	Team Kygnus Tonen	SUZ	FUJ	MIN; 13	SUZ	SUG	FUJ	SUZ; NC	SUZ; 10				NC	0
1992	Stellar International	SUZ; 7	FUJ; Ret	MIN; 7	SUZ; 4	AUT; 4	SUG; 6	FUJ; 11	FUJ; 8	SUZ; 2	FUJ; 4	FUJ; 12	9th	16
1993	Stellar International	SUZ; 5	FUJ; 6	MIN; Ret	SUZ; 4	AUT; C	SUG; 8	FUJ; C	FUJ; Ret	SUZ; Ret	FUJ; 9	SUZ; 3	8th	10
1994	Stellar International	**SUZ**; 13	**FUJ**; 1	MIN; 2	SUZ; Ret	SUG; 2	**FUJ**; 1	SUZ; 3	FUJ; 5	FUJ; 1	**SUZ**; Ret		**2nd**	**45**
1995	Stellar International	**SUZ**; 8	FUJ; C	MIN; Ret	SUZ; 11	SUG; 6	FUJ; 1	TOK; 8	FUJ; 6	SUZ; 6			7th	12
1996	Kanagawa Clinic Stellar	SUZ; Ret	MIN; Ret	FUJ; 7	TOK; 15	SUZ; Ret	SUG; 4	FUJ; Ret	MIN; 7	SUZ; Ret	FUJ; 5		13th	5
1997	Auto Tech Stellar	SUZ	MIN	FUJ	SUZ; 12	SUG	FUJ; Ret	MIN	MOT	FUJ; 14	SUZ		NC	0

=== Complete British Touring Car Championship results ===
(key) (Races in bold indicate pole position in class) (Races in italics indicate fastest lap in class - 1 point awarded all races)

Year	Team	Car	Class	1	2	3	4	5	6	7	8	9	10	11	12	13	DC	Pts	Class
1989	Brodie Brittain Racing	Ford Sierra RS500	A	OUL	SIL	THR	DON ovr:10‡ cls:6‡	THR	SIL	SIL	BRH	SNE	BRH	BIR	DON	SIL	53rd	1	21st

‡ Endurance driver.

=== Complete Japanese Touring Car Championship results ===
(key) (Races in bold indicate pole position) (Races in italics indicate fastest lap)

Year	Team	Car	Class	1	2	3	4	5	6	7	8	9	10	11	12	13	14	15	16	17	18	DC	Pts
1991	Auto Tech Racing	BMW M3 Sport Evolution	JTC-2	SUG	SUZ	TSU; 7	SEN	AUT	FUJ; 19													47th	20
1992	Auto Tech Racing	BMW M3 Sport Evolution	JTC-2	AID; Ret	AUT; 2	SUG; 3	SUZ; 2	MIN; 2	TSU; 5	SEN; 1	FUJ; Ret											5th	85
1993	Auto Tech Racing	BMW M3 Sport Evolution	JTC-2	MIN; 1	AUT; 1	SUG; 1	SUZ; 1	AID; 2	TSU; 2	TOK; 1	SEN; 6	FUJ; NC										**1st**	**134**
1994	Auto Tech Racing	BMW 318i		AUT; 1; 7	AUT; 2; 4	SUG; 1; 5	SUG; 2 Ret	TOK; 1 Ret	TOK; 2; 11	SUZ; 1; 11	SUZ; 2; 10	MIN; 1; 9	MIN; 2; 6	AID; 1; 8	AID; 2 Ret	TSU; 1; 6	TSU; 2; 12	SEN; 1; 16	SEN; 2; 15	FUJ; 1 Ret	FUJ; 2 Ret	9th	34
1995	Mazdaspeed	Mazda Familia		FUJ; 1	FUJ; 2	SUG; 1	SUG; 2	TOK; 1	TOK; 2	SUZ; 1	SUZ; 2	MIN; 1	MIN; 2	AID; 1; 18	AID; 2; 16	SEN; 1 Ret	SEN; 2 Ret	FUJ; 1 Ret	FUJ; 2 Ret			NC	0

=== 24 Hours of Le Mans results ===
Year	Team	Co-Drivers	Car	Class	Laps	Pos.	Class Pos.
1989	(United Kingdom) Silk Cut Jaguar (United Kingdom) Tom Walkinshaw Racing	(France) Patrick Tambay (Netherlands) Jan Lammers	Jaguar XJR-9LM	C1	380	4th	4th
1997	(United Kingdom) Gulf Team Davidoff (United Kingdom) GTC Racing	(United Kingdom) Ray Bellm (Japan) Masanori Sekiya	McLaren F1 GTR	GT1	326	DNF	DNF

== Sources ==
- Historic racing drivers site

Sporting positions
Preceded by Julian Bailey	Formula Ford Festival Winner; 1983	Succeeded by Gerrit van Kouwen
