= Gordon Murray Automotive =

British car manufacturer

- Type: Subsidiary
- Industry: Automotive
- Founded: 2017; 9 years ago
- Founder: Gordon Murray
- Headquarters: Windlesham, Surrey, England
- Area served: Worldwide
- Key people: Carl-Peter Forster (Director); Dario Franchitti (Consultant)
- Products: Sports cars
- Services: Engineering consultation
- Parent: Gordon Murray Group
- Website: gordonmurrayautomotive.com

Gordon Murray Automotive (GMA) is a British automobile manufacturer of sports cars based in Windlesham, Surrey, England, which was founded in 2017 by former Formula 1 and McLaren F1 designer Gordon Murray.

== History ==
Murray founded GMA in 2017, with an initial focus on limited-run supercars.

In 2020, GMA launched the T.50, a lightweight, driver focused supercar as an ethos continuation from Murray's F1 project. A number of unique elements of the T.50 gained acclaim, including the 3.9 litre Cosworth V12 engine which revs to over 12,000rpm and the ground-effect fan system, a nod to the Brabham BT46B "Fan Car" that Murray designed for Formula One in 1978. Production began in 2023, and ended in 2025 after 100 units were produced. A number of T.50 customers are also McLaren F1 owners, with chassis 64 finished in the same specification as the owners F1. Jamiroquai lead singer Jay Kay is also a T.50 owner. A special T.50s Niki Lauda edition was revealed in 2021, as a track only 25 unit production car priced at £3.7m.

== New headquarters ==
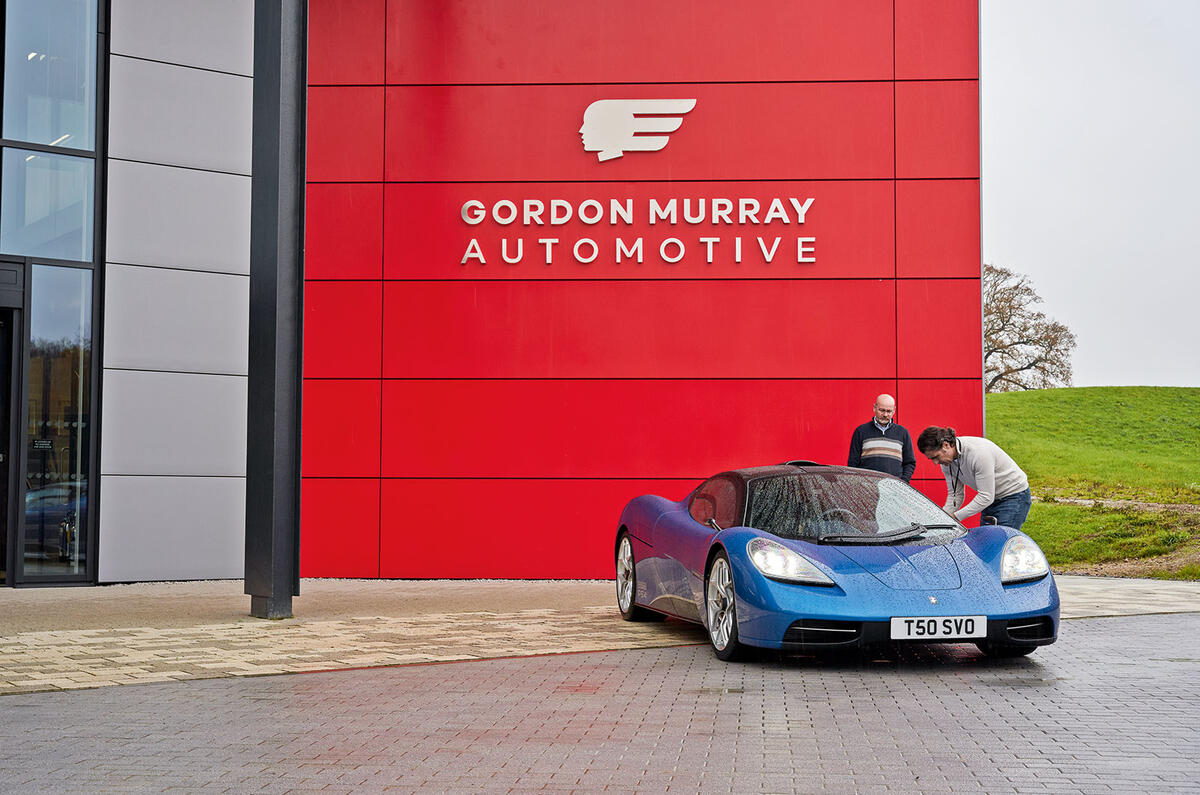
GMA Headquarters in July 2025 with a T.50.

In 2022, GMA moved into a new headquarters at Highams Park in Surrey, constructed by Mace Group. The facility was completed fully by 2024 to include a test road, extensive manufacturing and specification facilities and a large display area. Moving in 2023, GMA revealed their second supercar the T.33, based around the T.50 package, but designed to be used more frequently by owners. It does not have the ground effect fan used in the T.50 and is a limited run production of just 100 vehicles. All were sold before production began, at an anticipated £1.4m each. A track focused T.33S was planned to launch in 2025, but is not yet available, and a convertible version was also made available.

In 2025, GMA launched a Special Vehicles Division which will produce bespoke supercars. Murray himself, and GMA, were the central feature at the 2025 Goodwood Festival of Speed. In May, GMA was given a King’s Award for Enterprise recognising the T.50 as a world leader in innovation.

== Products ==
=== Models ===
Model	Year introduced	Units	Description
T.50	2020	100	GMA's launch vehicle
T.50s Niki Lauda	2020	25	Track only variant of the T.50, named after three time Formula One World Champion, Niki Lauda
T.33	2024	300	Available as both a coupé and convertible with a performance variant planned
S1 LM	2025	5	Bespoke model made by GMA Special Vehicles, based on the T.50
Le Mans GTR	2025	24	Made by GMA Special Vehicles
S1	2026	64	Developed from the S1 LM platform, with a more touring-focused character.

== See also ==
- McLaren F1
- Brabham BT46
