= T.25 =

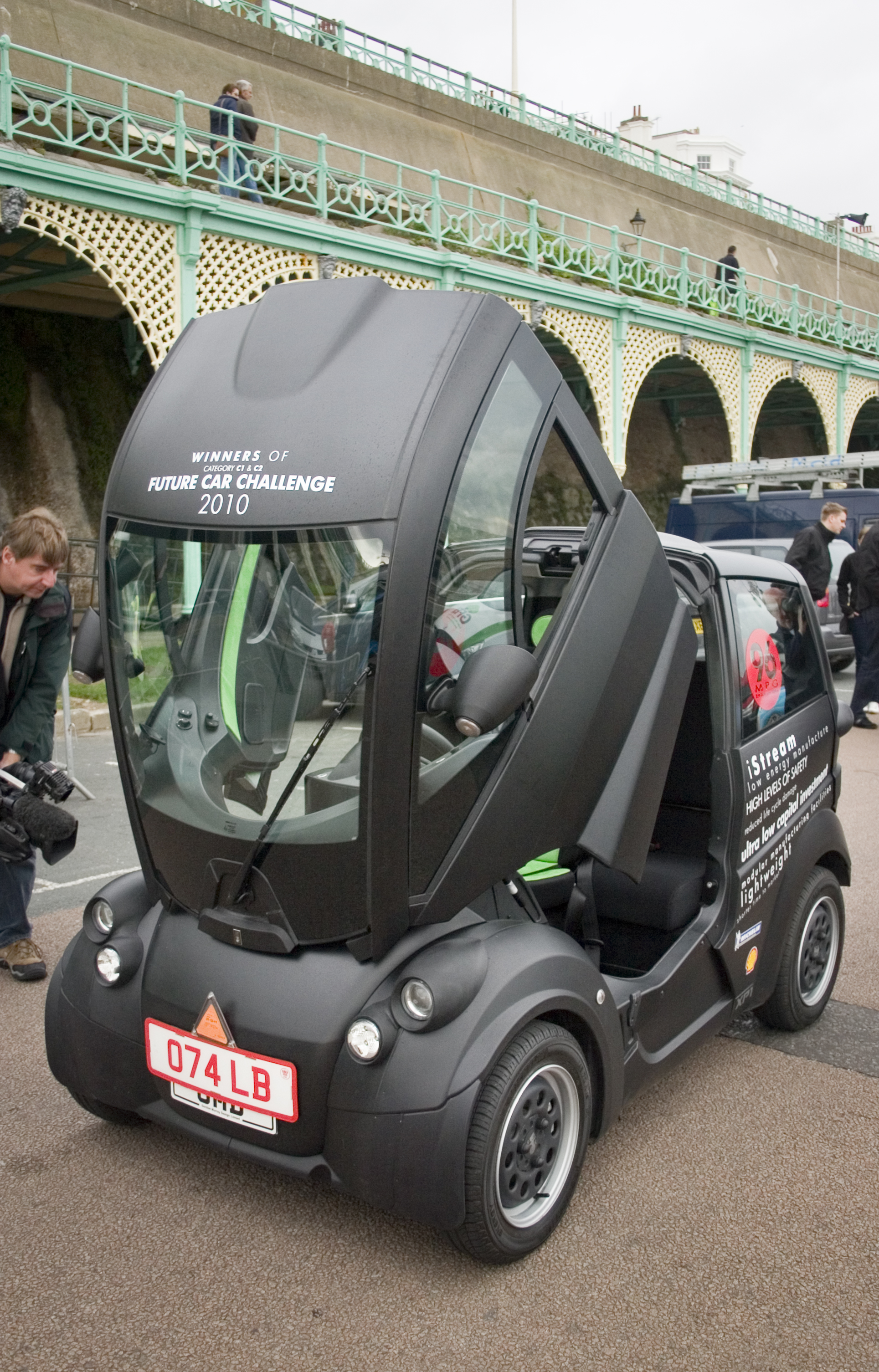

Overview
- Manufacturer: Gordon Murray Design

Body and chassis
- Body style: 1-door city car

Powertrain
- Engine: Straight 3 0.66 L (40 cu in)

Dimensions
- Length: 2.4 m (7 ft 10 in)
- Width: 1.3 m (4 ft 3 in)
- Height: 1.6 m (5 ft 3 in)
- Kerb weight: 575 kg (1,268 lb)

The T.25 or Type 25 is a concept city car designed by Gordon Murray, who created the McLaren F1 supercar. The car made its first public appearance on June 28, 2010 at the UK's Smith School of Enterprise and the Environment in Oxford.

== Description ==
At 2.4 metres (7 ft 10 1/2 in) long, 1.3 metres (4 ft 3 in) wide and 1.6 metres (5 ft 3 in) high; the T.25 is smaller than Daimler AG's popular Smart. The centralized driving position is also a feature of Murray's iconic McLaren F1; central instrumentation and controls are borrowed from Formula One. It is a three-seater car with a rear-mounted three-cylinder petrol engine. From the details released by its designer Murray, three T.25s can be parked in one standard UK parallel parking space, thereby increasing much needed urban parking capacity; in addition, its compact size will allow two T.25s to travel side-by-side (theoretically) in one UK motorway lane.

An electric version, called the "T.27", was unveiled in June 2011.

Both cars are expected to have a top speed of 65 mph (105 km/h).

Autocar Magazine Reported in August 2013 that the Murray T25 and T27 were confirmed for production, that the city cars project had been sold to a manufacturer, and were estimated to be launched in 2016. As of 2023, this launch had still not occurred.
