= Zytek Automotive =

British powertrain and vehicle engineering specialist

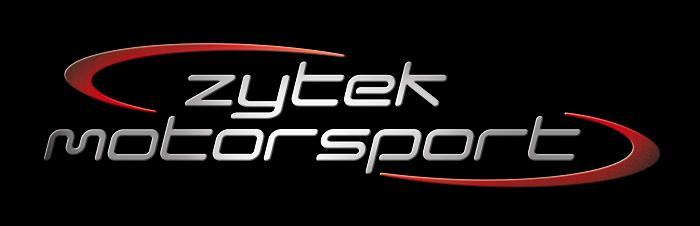

Zytek Automotive is a British powertrain and vehicle engineering specialist, which has been part of Continental AG since 2014. Zytek Automotive designs, develops, and integrates electric motors into a range of cars and commercial vehicles. The UK facility can accommodate up to 6,000 E-Drive integrations a year in batches as low as 100.

== Ownership history ==
In 1981 Mason and Gibson founded the Zytech Group with two main divisions: Zytek Automotive, based at Fradley, Staffordshire; and Zytek Engineering, based at Repton, Derbyshire.

In 2000, Motorola procured 19% of the Zytek Automotive and in 2006 this passed to Continental AG, a German engineering company, who purchased all of Motorola's automotive divisions & subsequently started raising their stock-holding of Zytek Automotive to 50%. Since 2014, Zytek Automotive has been part of Continental AG after they purchased the whole business.

Zytek Engineering, the other part of the Zytek Group, remained under Mason and Gibson's leadership and was renamed Gibson Technology on 1 October 2014

== History ==
When Zytek was founded in 1981 the initial company focus was on engine management systems for motorsport.

By 1987 Zytek had expanded its operations to include race car engines as a specialty, working with teams and supporting championships such as the Le Mans Series, Formula 3000, Auto GP and the Renault FR3.5 Series.

During the 1990s, Zytek also developed high power-density electric vehicle drivetrains, creating what was the highest power-density EV drivetrain at the time. Zytek's success in motorsport led to working with road cars on the Proto ESX HEV Series hybrid drivetrain design, and the creation of engine management systems for the Jaguar XJ220 sports car. This led to further collaborations with automobile manufacturers.

Zytek has been developing vehicle electrification and electronics for road vehicles since 1997. Its first notable project was the Aston Martin DB7 engine management system and it has since gone onto collaborate with Jaguar Land Rover, Aston Martin, Rolls-Royce Bentley and Dodge. In 2001 Zytek worked with GM to assist with the creation on a new concept hybrid truck, the electrification system offering fuel efficiency saving in day-to-day use as part of a turnkey hybrid development programme.

In 2006, Zytek converted one hundred Smart Fortwo to fully electric vehicles, which took part in UK market trials as lease vehicles from 2007 to 2009. In 2009 Zytek developed a hydrogen fuel cell concept with Morgan, the EV3. The 70 kW integrated drivetrain installed in the Modec electric vehicle is designed and manufactured in house by Zytek, as well as the drivetrain in the E Vito Taxi. Zytek works with the EV conversion company RBW Classic Electric Cars to provide EV drivetrains.

In the early 2010s Zytek collaborated with Audi on the key electrification technology for the Audi R8 e-tron which set records for the fastest production electric car at the Nürburgring. The car was also featured in the Iron Man movie.

The current family of electric motors ranges up to 170 kW.

=== Gordon Murray collaboration ===
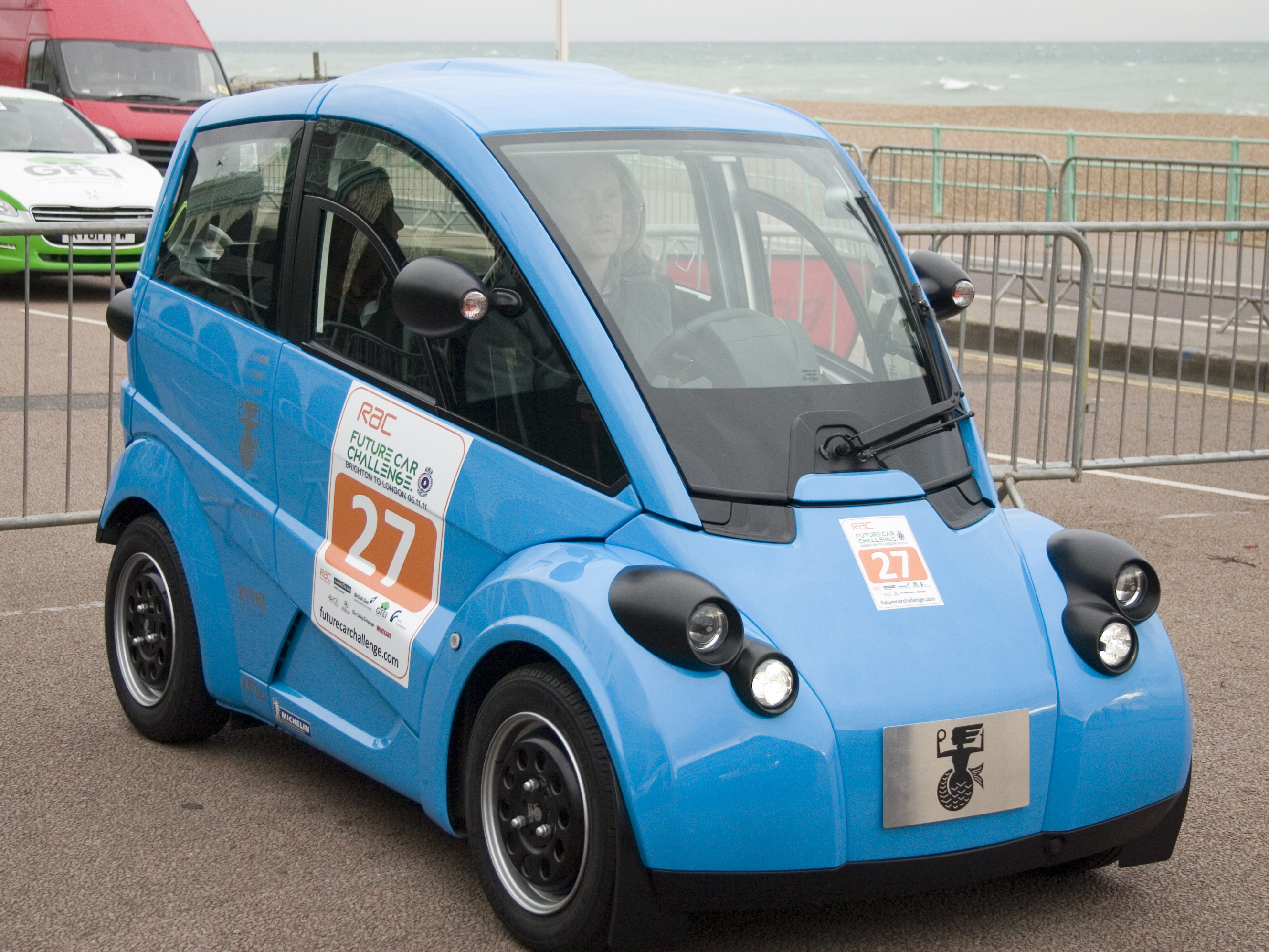
Gordon Murray Design T.27

Launched in 2011 with Gordon Murray Design, Zytek helped develop the Gordon Murray T.27 all-electric three seater road car. With a total cost of £9m, the T.27 was made possible via £4.5m of investment from the UK government backed Technology Strategy Board. With a total cost of £9m (US$14.4 million in June 2010), the research and development project allowed the consortium to develop a prototype that was unveiled at the Royal Automobile Club in June 2011. The T.27 road debut was held in November 2011 at the RAC Future Car Challenge. As of 2011, Gordon Murray Design was negotiating with three manufacturers for possible production of the T.27.

== Motorsport ==
Zytek first started working in motorsport in 1981 specialising in engine management systems.

In 1984, for the Toleman-Hart car driven by Ayrton Senna, Zytek developed the first fully electronic engine management system within Formula One.

In 2009, for Mercedes/McLaren driven by Lewis Hamilton, Zytek developed the first kinetic energy recovery system to win an F1 race.

Since 2014 Zytek has developed vehicle electrification technology within Formula E as an electric inverter and motor supplier.

Its customer included 4 out of 6 drivers and manufacturers championships and 16 race wins.

For the Super GT racing series in Japan, Zytek developed an ERS system For the Honda 300/500. The developed hybrid system was retrofitted to Honda's existing platform.

Zytek also has worked with Formula 3000, Le Mans Series, Renault FR3.5 Series and the Auto GP Championships.

2014 saw Zytek engaged as the electric inverter and motor supplier to a team in the first season of Formula E. This engagement saw Zytek having to deliver race-worthy systems in six months. It was a supplier in further seasons with the Formula E World Champions.

== See also ==
- Gordon Murray
- Continental AG
- Gibson Technology
