= Gordon Murray Automotive S1 =

Overview
- Manufacturer: Gordon Murray Automotive
- Production: 2025 (S1 LM)
- Designer: Gordon Murray

Body and chassis
- Class: Sports car (S)
- Body style: 2-door coupé

Powertrain
- Engine: 4.2L Cosworth GMA V12 (S1); 4.3L Cosworth GMA V12 (S1 LM)

Dimensions
- Curb weight: 997 kg (S1); 957 kg (S1 LM)

The Gordon Murray Automotive S1 is a sports car manufactured by Gordon Murray Automotive. Originally conceived as a few-off with the S1 LM variant in 2025, in 2026 at The Quail GMA revealed the more street focused S1 with a planned production run of 64 vehicles. However, despite the production run being generally larger than other few-off cars of GMA, the S1 (like the S1 LM) is still produced by the Special Vehicles division of GMA.

The car features a 4.2L V12, a larger displacement development of the Cosworth V12 used in previous Gordon Murray Automotive vehicles such as the T.50. It is claimed by GMA that the S1 weighs less than 997 kg.

In 2025 S1 LM chassis number 001 was sold at auction for $20,630,000, setting a then record for the highest sale price of a new car.

== Variants ==
=== S1 LM ===
The S1 LM was the first of the S1 variants, being revealed at The Quail in 2025. It had a production run of 5 vehicles all sold to the same buyer, however at least one was sold shortly after for a then new production car record of $20,630,000.

Compared to the S1, the S1 LM features a slightly larger displacement engine of 4.3L and a lower advertised weight of 957 kg, combined with more downforce from a large rear wing and front splitter.

The design of the S1 LM is an homage to the Le Mans winning McLaren F1 GTR, closely resembling it in many aspects.
