= Gibson Technology =

English automotive and motorsport company

Gibson Technology Limited
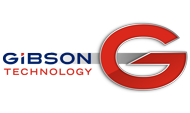
- Formerly: Zytek Engineering Limited
- Type: Private limited company
- Founded: 1981
- Founder: Bill Gibson; Brian Mason
- Headquarters: Repton, Derbyshire, United Kingdom
- Products: Racing engines
- Revenue: £8,127,658 (2024)
- Operating income: £864,765 (2024)
- Net income: £893,486 (2024)
- Total assets: £6,147,145 (2024)
- Total equity: £6,147,145 (2024)
- Number of employees: 63
- Website: www.gibsontech.co.uk

Gibson Technology is an automotive and motorsport company based at Repton, Derbyshire, England. It was founded by Bill Gibson and Brian Mason as Zytek Engineering in 1981.

== Ownership history ==
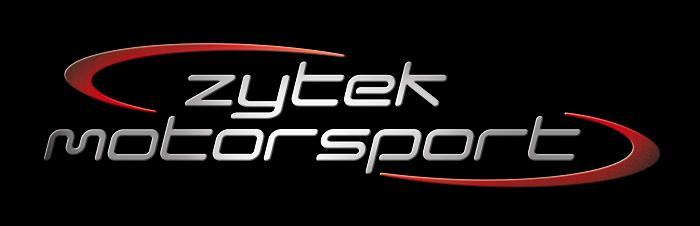
Zytek Motorsport logo

In 1981 Gibson and Mason founded the Zytek Group with two main divisions: Zytek Automotive, based at Fradley, Staffordshire; and Zytek Engineering, based at Repton, Derbyshire.

In 2000, Motorola procured 19% of the Zytek Automotive. In 2006, this passed to Continental AG, a German engineering company, who purchased all of Motorola's automotive divisions and subsequently started raising their stock-holding of Zytek Automotive to 50%. Since 2014, Zytek Automotive has been part of Continental AG after they purchased the whole business.

Zytek Engineering, the other part of the Zytek Group, remained under Gibson's leadership and was renamed Gibson Technology on 1 October 2014.

== Motorsport history ==
Zytek Motorsport is the brand name used for the Zytek Group's motorsport product range and applications.

In 1987, Zytek bought the British Alan Smith Racing outfit in order to expand its motorsports involvement. The team initially supported the Jordan Grand Prix team in Formula 3000 before the team eventually chose to concentrate on engine development.

Zytek returned to running a motorsports team in 2004 when the company entered the Le Mans Endurance Series with their first sports car, the Zytek 04S, which finished second in the team championship in 2005 due to two overall victories. Zytek Engineering continues to campaign in the Le Mans Series as well as in the American Le Mans Series and 24 Hours of Le Mans.

=== 2000s ===
In 2002, Zytek bought some of the remains of the defunct Reynard Motorsport from International Racing Management (IRM). These assets included the rights to the Reynard 02S Le Mans Prototype, of which only one had been completed since the company's demise. Zytek already supplied an engine to the existing chassis, and would therefore build further copies under the name Zytek 04S, offering both the chassis and engine as a complete package.

Due to changes in the prototype regulations in 2006, Zytek upgraded one of their existing 04S chassis while building a third all-new car, named the 06S. Further regulation changes in 2007 required the team to build an entirely new car, the Zytek-07S, which campaigned in both the LMP1 and LMP2 classes of the Le Mans Series.

Zytek's GZ09S proved an immediate success in 2009, taking the LMP2 Le Mans Series Team Championship with Quifel-ASM and the Driver's Championship with Miguel Amaral and Olivier Pla.

In 2009 Zytek Engineering became the first manufacturer to score a podium with a hybrid LMP. The car, run by Corsa Motorsports, finished on the podium on its debut at Lime Rock. The Zytek Q10 Hybrid is a non-invasive parallel hybrid system, consisting of a motor-generator, battery and inverter. Its purpose is to recover energy normally wasted during deceleration and subsequently use this energy to assist the internal combustion engine during acceleration.

=== 2010s as Zytek ===
The Z11SN has also won the LMP2 category of the 24 Hours of Le Mans in both 2011 and 2014, and the Le Mans Series in 2011, in the hands of Greaves Motorsport (2011) and Team Jota (2014).

=== 2010s as Gibson ===
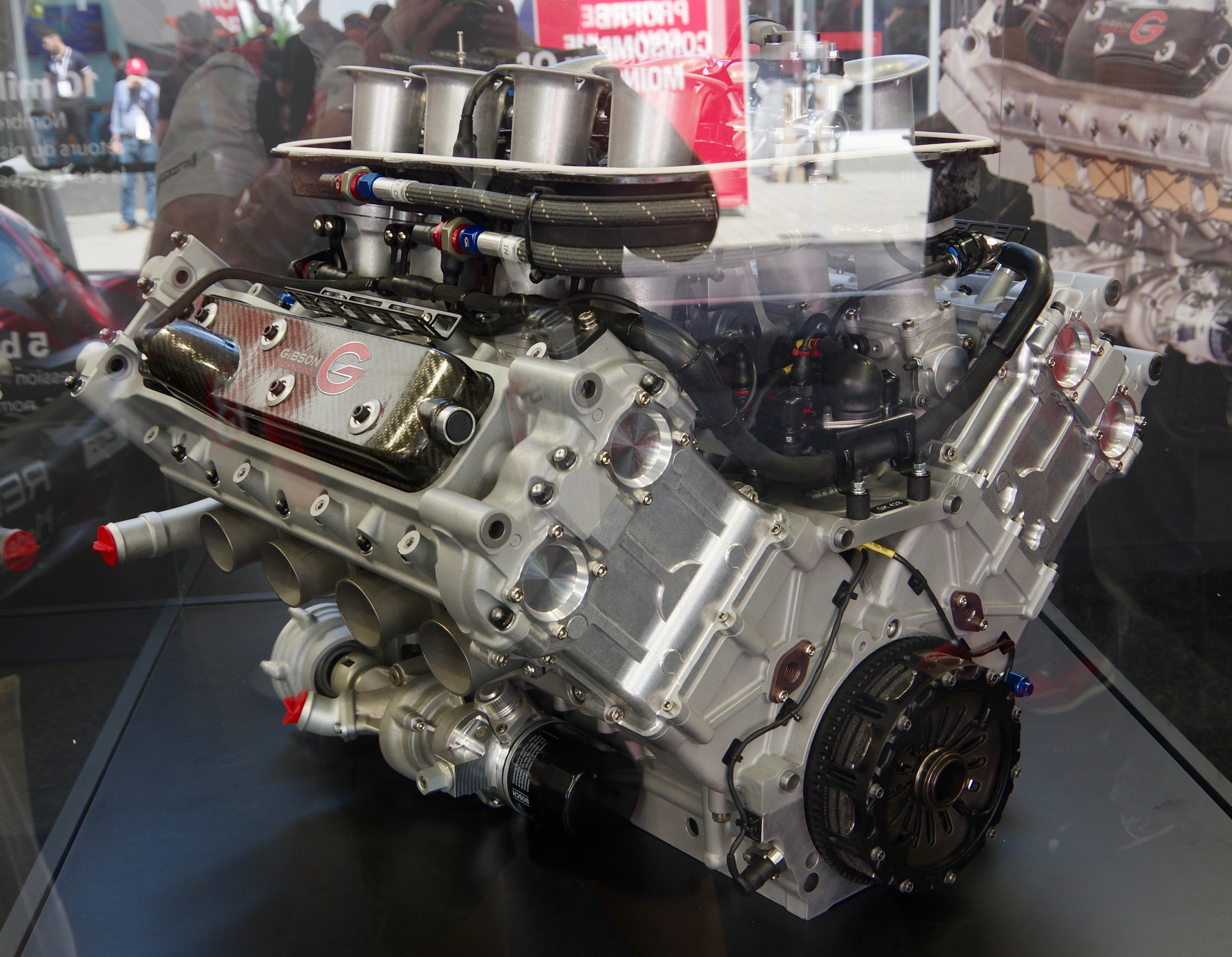
Gibson Technology GL458

In 2017 the rebranded company became the exclusive supplier of the GK428 4.2-litre, naturally-aspirated V8 engine, producing approximately 600 hp, for the LMP2 Class for the European Le Mans Series, FIA World Endurance Championship and WeatherTech SportsCar Championship. Two of the many LMP2 cars powered by Gibson engines finished on the overall podium, and one led the race overall for some time until a recovering factory Porsche reclaimed the lead.

In 2018, Gibson's new LMP1 engine, the 4.5-litre naturally aspirated GL458, was installed into Rebellion Racing's pair of Rebellion R13s and DragonSpeeds BR Engineering BR1. The engine brought Rebellion's R13s to a 3-4 finish (1-2 among privateer teams) at Le Mans, behind the Toyota TS050 Hybrids. In February 2019, ByKolles Racing announced that they would be switching to the Gibson GL458, dropping the Nissan Nismo VRX30A 3.0 litre twin-turbo V6, for their CLM P1/01.

=== 2020s ===
Gibson was awarded the exclusive engine tender for the 2028 LMP2 regulations.

== Zytek Automotive ==
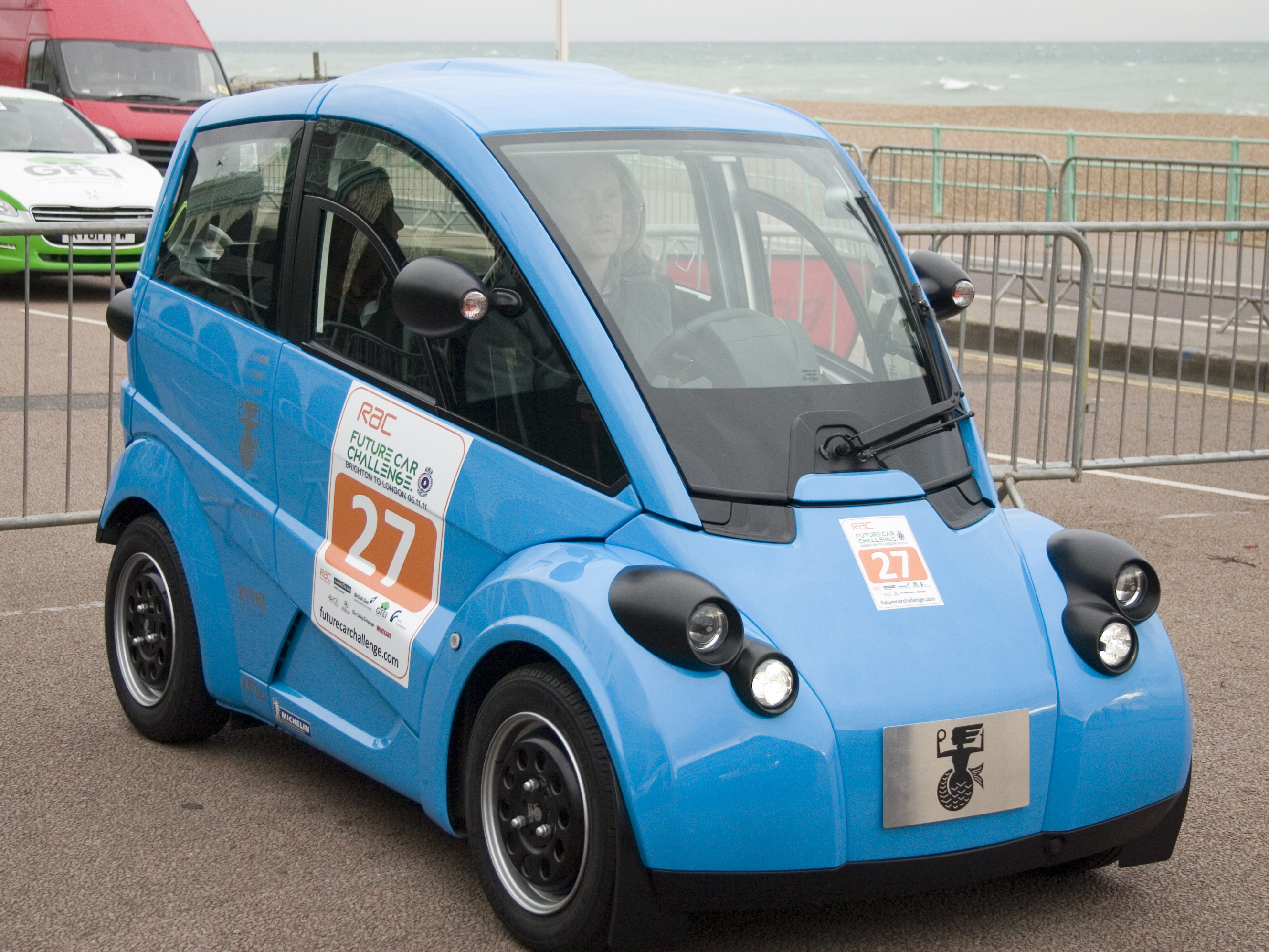
Gordon Murray Design T.27

Zytek Automotive is a specialist powertrain and vehicle engineering enterprise, which has been part of Continental AG, a German engineering company, since 2014. It designs, develops, and integrates electric motors into a range of cars and commercial vehicles.

Gordon Murray Design and Zytek Automotive developed an all-electric three-seater city car, the T.27, made possible through a £4.5 million (US$7.2 million in June 2010) investment from the government-backed Technology Strategy Board.

== See also ==
- Zytek Automotive
