= Light Car Company =

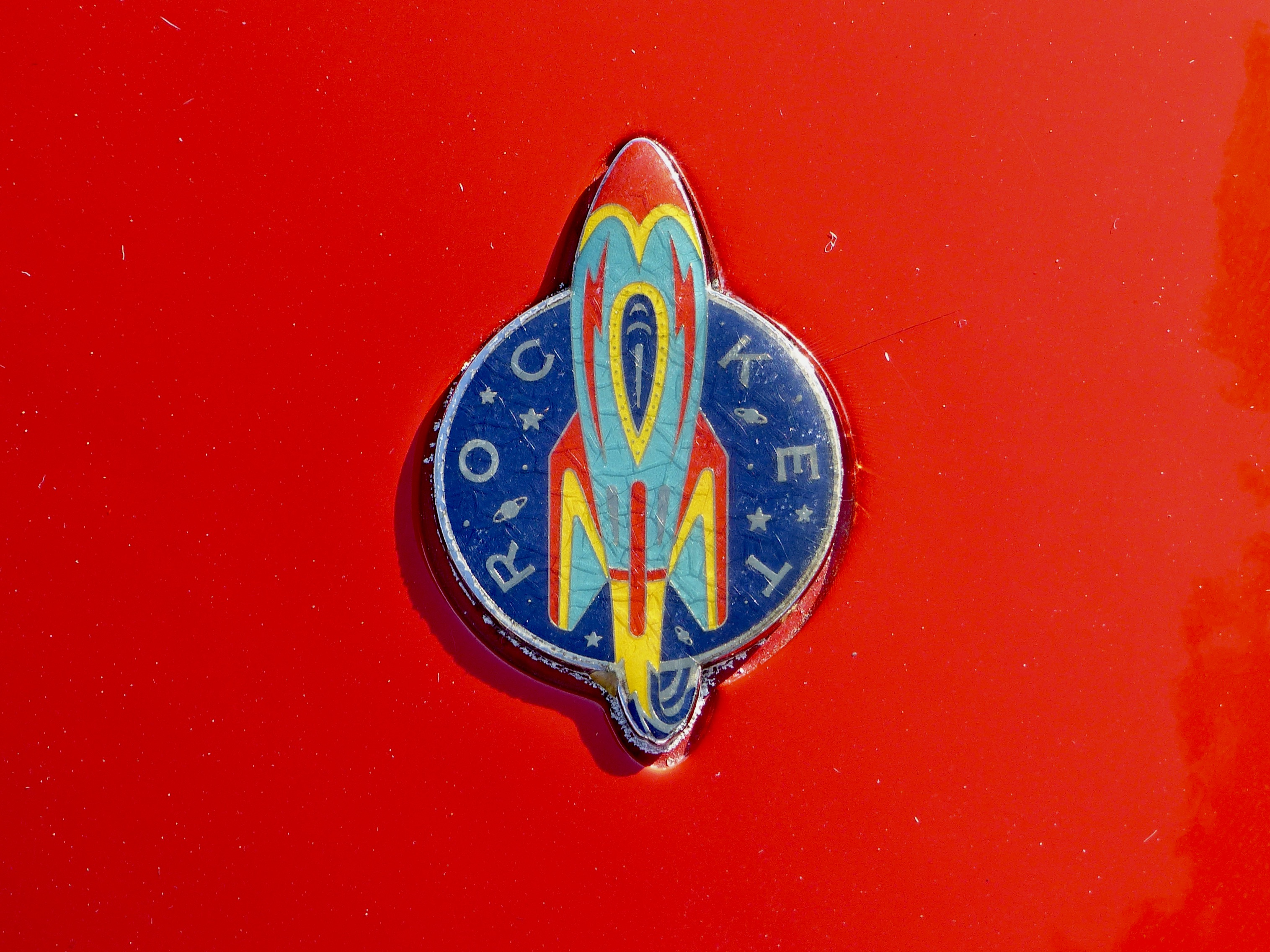
- Industry: Automotive
- Founded: 1991
- Founder: Gordon Murray/Chris Craft
- Headquarters: St Neots, UK
- Area served: Worldwide
- Products: Cars
- Production output: 55 vehicles

Light Car Company Rocket

Overview
- Manufacturer: Light Car Company
- Production: 1991-1998 (55 vehicles produced)

Body and chassis
- Layout: mid-engine, rear-wheel-drive layout

Powertrain
- Engine: Yamaha 1,000 cc inline-four, 4-stroke, air-cooled motorcycle engine, mid-engine, rear-wheel-drive
- Transmission: 5- or 6-speed sequential manual gearbox

Dimensions
- Wheelbase: 2413 mm (95.0 in)
- Length: 3,518 m (11,542 ft)
- Width: 1,600 m (5,200 ft)
- Height: 914 m (2,999 ft)
- Curb weight: 385 kg (850 lb)

The Light Car Company was a British manufacturer of automobiles.

== Company history ==
Gordon Murray and Chris Craft founded the Light Car Company in St Neots in 1991 and started producing automobiles. Production ran until 1998.

== Vehicles ==
The only model was the Rocket. The vehicle was built to be extremely lightweight, weighing only 850 pounds (385.6 kg), less than the Lotus Seven or Caterham 7. The open, doorless body has space for two people in a tandem configuration. A frame formed the chassis. A 1,000 cc Yamaha engine with options of 143 hp or 165 hp powered the vehicle. The top speed was 230 km/h (142.9 mph) for the lower-powered model. The Rocket has a wheelbase of 2413 mm, total dimensions are 3518 mm long, 1600 mm wide and 914 mm high.

Rocket R & D Limited released a new version of the vehicle in 2007.

== Gallery ==
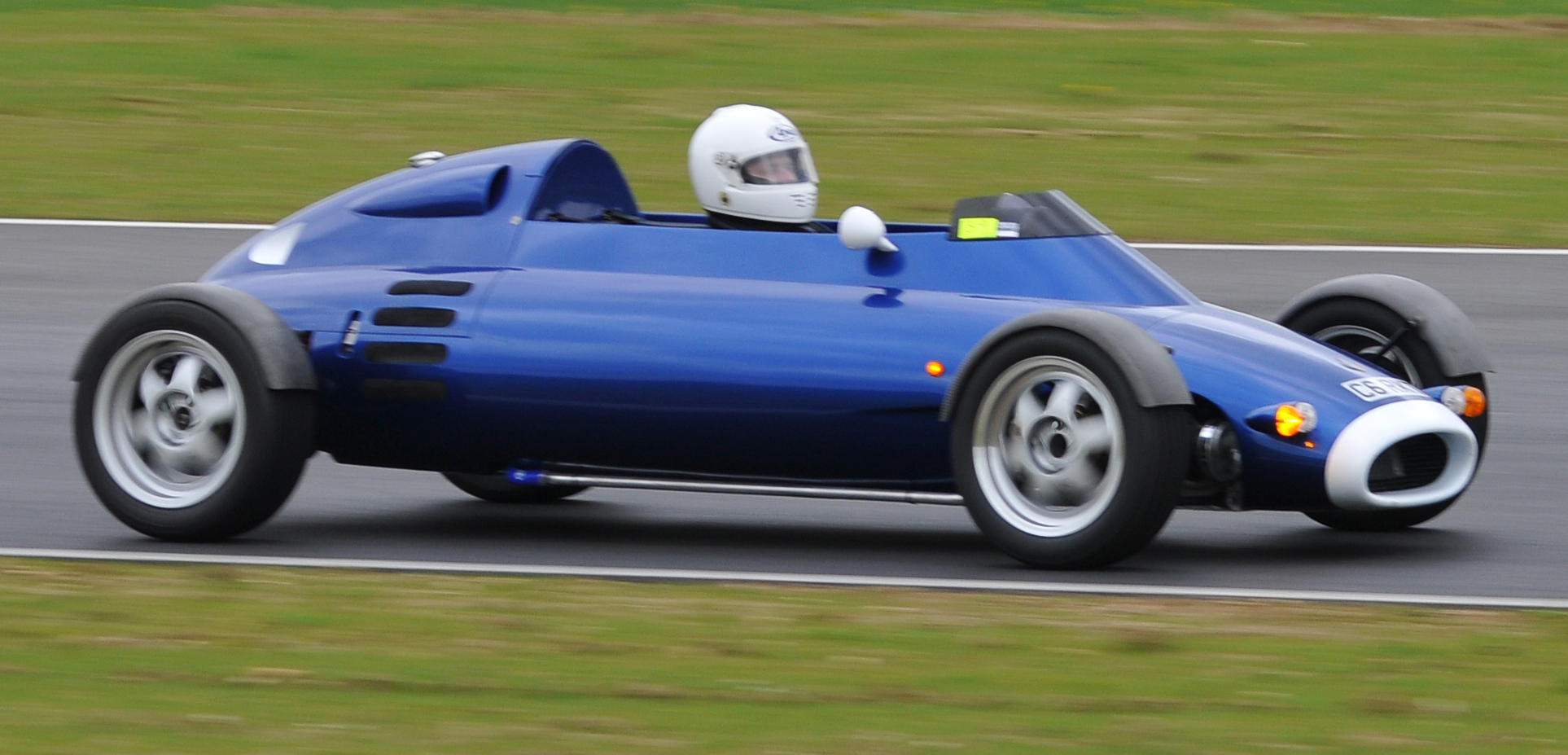
Light Car Company Rocket at the Snetterton Trackday

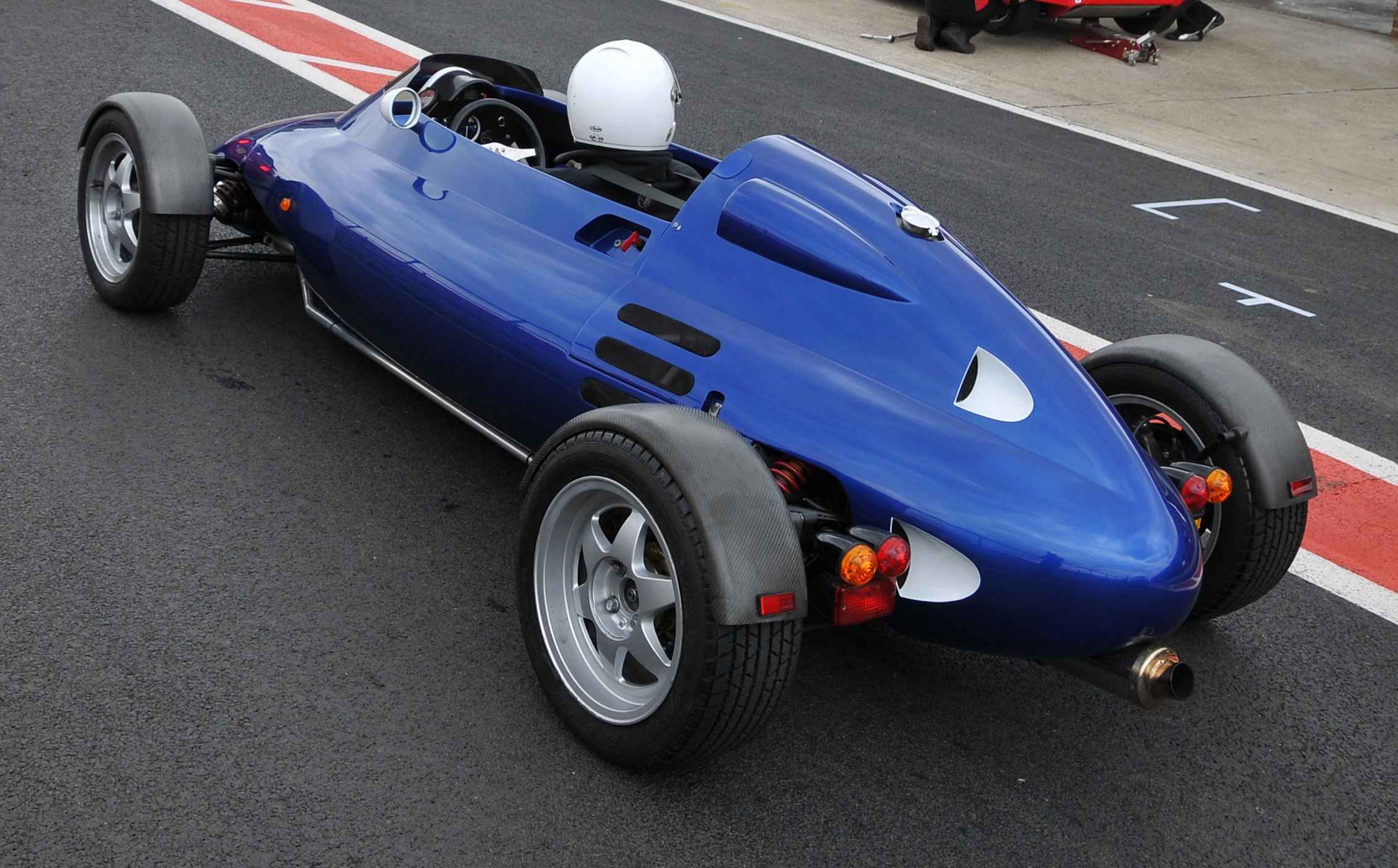
Rear end
