= McLaren F1 =

British sports car designed and manufactured by McLaren Automotive

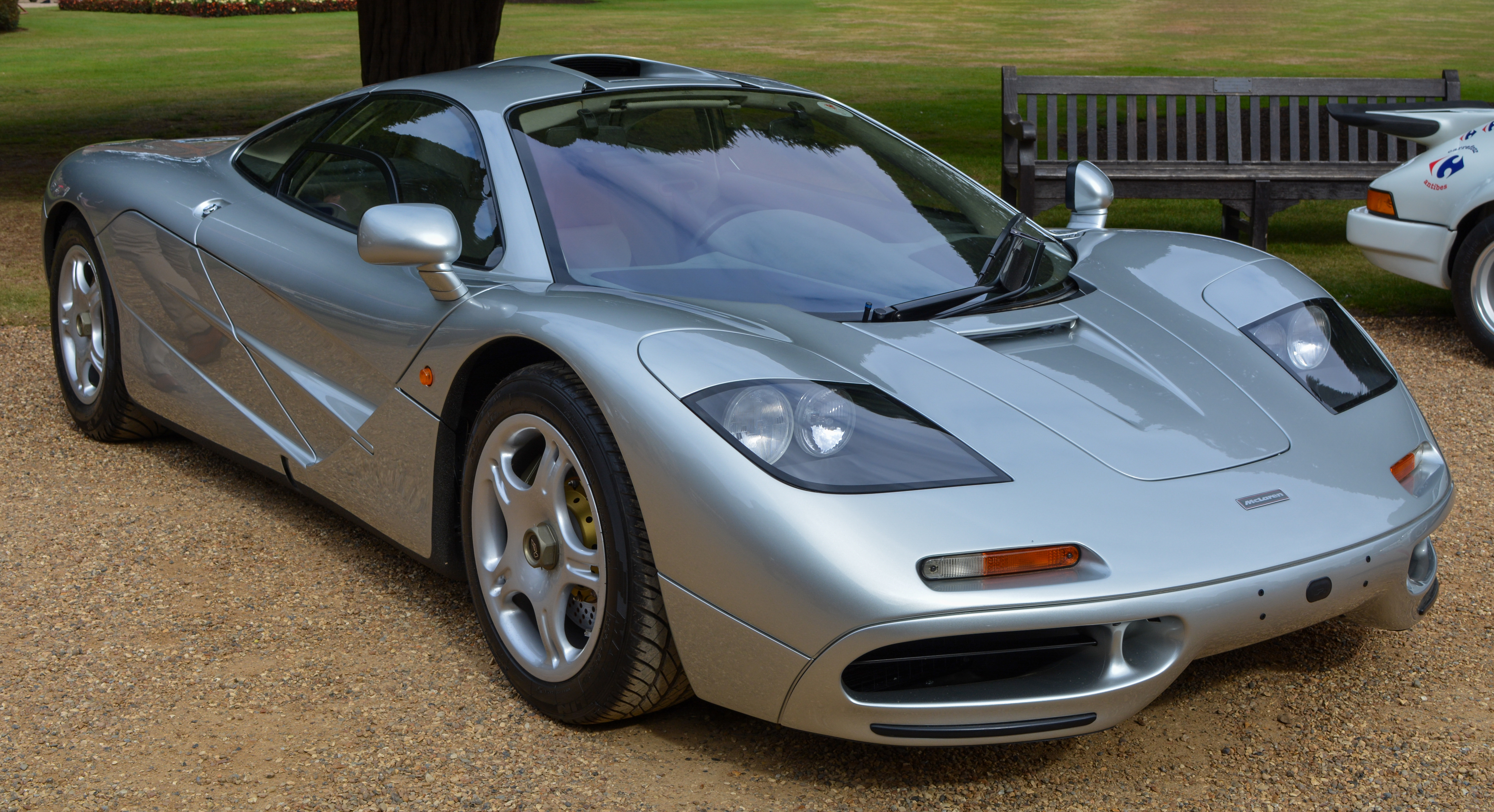
- McLaren F1 chassis #063, built in 1997

Overview
- Manufacturer: McLaren Cars
- Production: 1992–1998
- Assembly: United Kingdom: Woking, Surrey, England
- Designer: Gordon Murray; Peter Stevens; Paul Rosche (engine designer) (BMW)

Body and chassis
- Class: Sports car (S)
- Body style: 2-door coupé
- Layout: Rear mid-engine, rear-wheel-drive
- Doors: Butterfly doors
- Related: McLaren F1 GTR; McLaren F1 LM; McLaren F1 GT

Powertrain
- Engine: 6.1 L (6,064 cc) BMW S70/2 V12
- Power output: 461 kW (618 hp; 627 PS); 650 N⋅m (479 lbf⋅ft) of torque
- Transmission: 6-speed manual

Dimensions
- Wheelbase: 2,718 mm (107.0 in)
- Length: 4,287 mm (168.8 in)
- Width: 1,820 mm (71.7 in)
- Height: 1,140 mm (44.9 in)
- Kerb weight: 1,140 kg (2,513 lb) dry 1,260 kg (2,778 lb) kerb

Chronology
- Successor: McLaren P1 (spiritual); GMA T.50 (spiritual)

The McLaren F1 is a sports car that was the first type approved road-going car manufactured by British Formula One team McLaren. It was the last road-legal, series-produced sportscar to win the 24 Hours of Le Mans race outright, as well as being recognised as the world's fastest 'production car' when launched. The original concept, by leading technical designer Gordon Murray, convinced then head of McLaren Ron Dennis, to support McLaren leaping into manufacturing road-going sportscars. Car designer Peter Stevens was hired to do the car's exterior and interior styling.

To manufacture the F1, McLaren Cars (now McLaren Automotive) was set up; and BMW was contracted to develop and make BMW S70/2 V12 engines, specifically and exclusively limited for use in the F1. The car had numerous proprietary designs and technologies. As one of the first sportscars with a fully carbon-fibre monocoque body and chassis structure, it is both lighter and more streamlined than many later competitors, despite the F1 having seats for three adults. An unconventional seating layout, with the driver's seat front and centre, and two passenger seats (on the driver's left and right), gives the driver improved visibility. Murray conceived the F1 as an exercise in creating 'the ultimate road-going sportscar', in the spirit of Bruce McLaren's original plans for the M6 GT.

Production began in 1992 and ended in 1998; in all, 106 cars were manufactured, with some variations in the design. Although not originally designed as a racing car, modified racing versions of the car won several races, including the 1995 24 Hours of Le Mans.

On 31 March 1998, the XP5 prototype with a modified rev limiter set the Guinness World Record for the world's fastest production car, reaching 240.1 mph (386.4 km/h), surpassing the Jaguar XJ220's 217.1 mph (349.4 km/h) record from 1992 achieved with an increased rev limit and catalytic converters removed.

== Critical reception, accolades ==
In 1994, the British car magazine Autocar stated in a road test regarding the F1, "The McLaren F1 is the finest driving machine yet built for the public road." They further stated, "The F1 will be remembered as one of the great events in the history of the car, and it may possibly be the fastest production road car the world will ever see." In 2005, Channel 4 placed the car at number one on their list of the 100 greatest cars, calling it "the greatest automotive achievement of all time". In popular culture, the McLaren F1 has earned its spot as 'The greatest automobile ever created' and 'The Most Excellent Sports Car of All Time' amongst a wide variety of car enthusiasts and lovers. Notable past and present McLaren F1 owners include Lewis Hamilton, Elon Musk, Rowan Atkinson, Jay Leno, George Harrison, Ralph Lauren, Nick Mason, and the Sultan of Brunei Hassanal Bolkiah. In the April 2017 issue of Top Gear Magazine, the McLaren F1 was listed as one of the fastest naturally aspirated cars currently available in the world, and in the same league as more modern vehicles such as the Ferrari Enzo and Aston Martin One-77 despite being produced and engineered 10 years prior to the Ferrari Enzo and 17 years prior to the Aston Martin One-77.

== Design and conception ==
The McLaren F1 logo

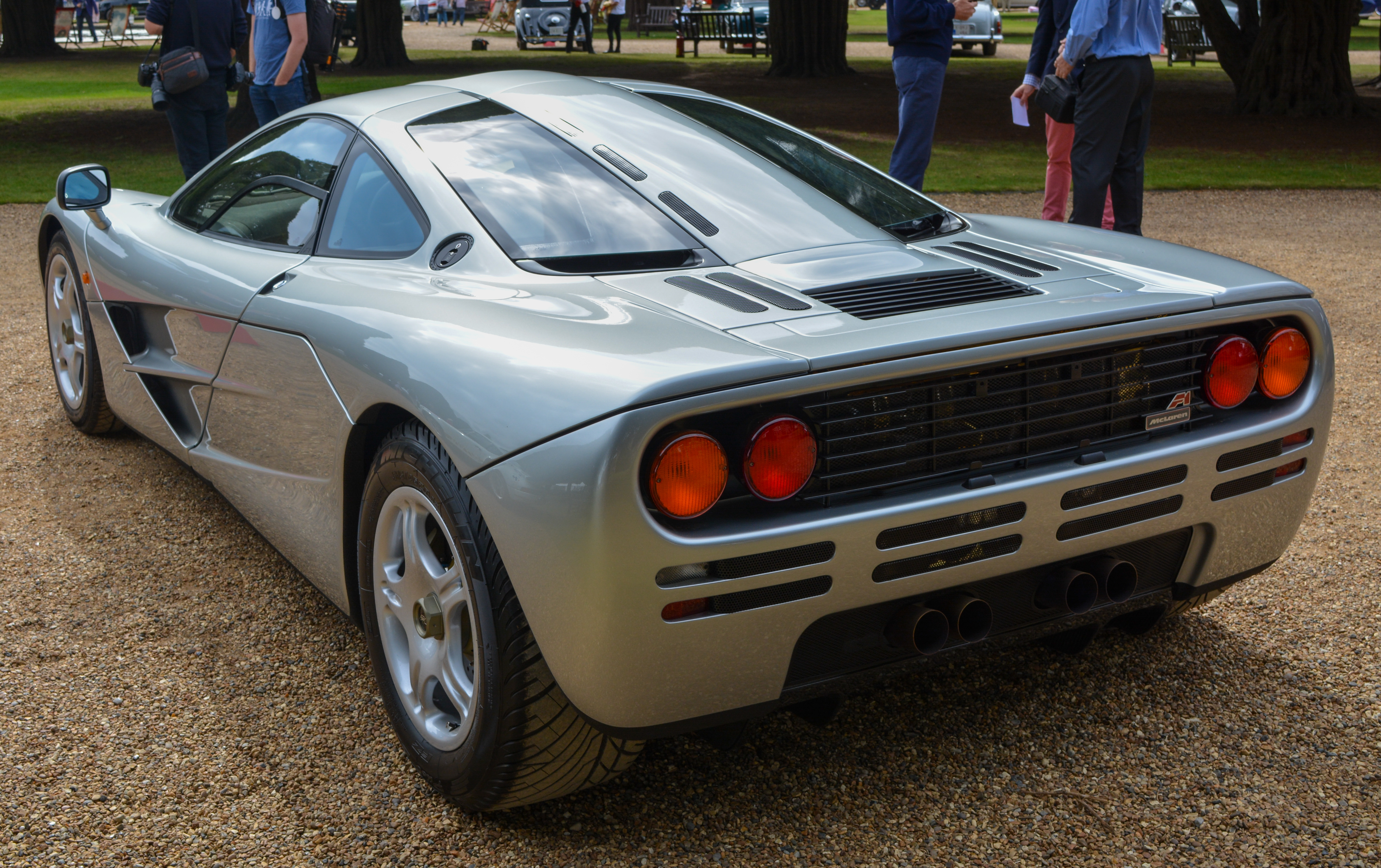
McLaren F1

Chief engineer Gordon Murray's design concept was a common one among designers of high-performance cars: low weight and high power. This was achieved through the use of high-tech and expensive materials such as carbon fibre, titanium, kevlar, magnesium and gold. The F1 was the first production car to use a carbon-fibre monocoque chassis.

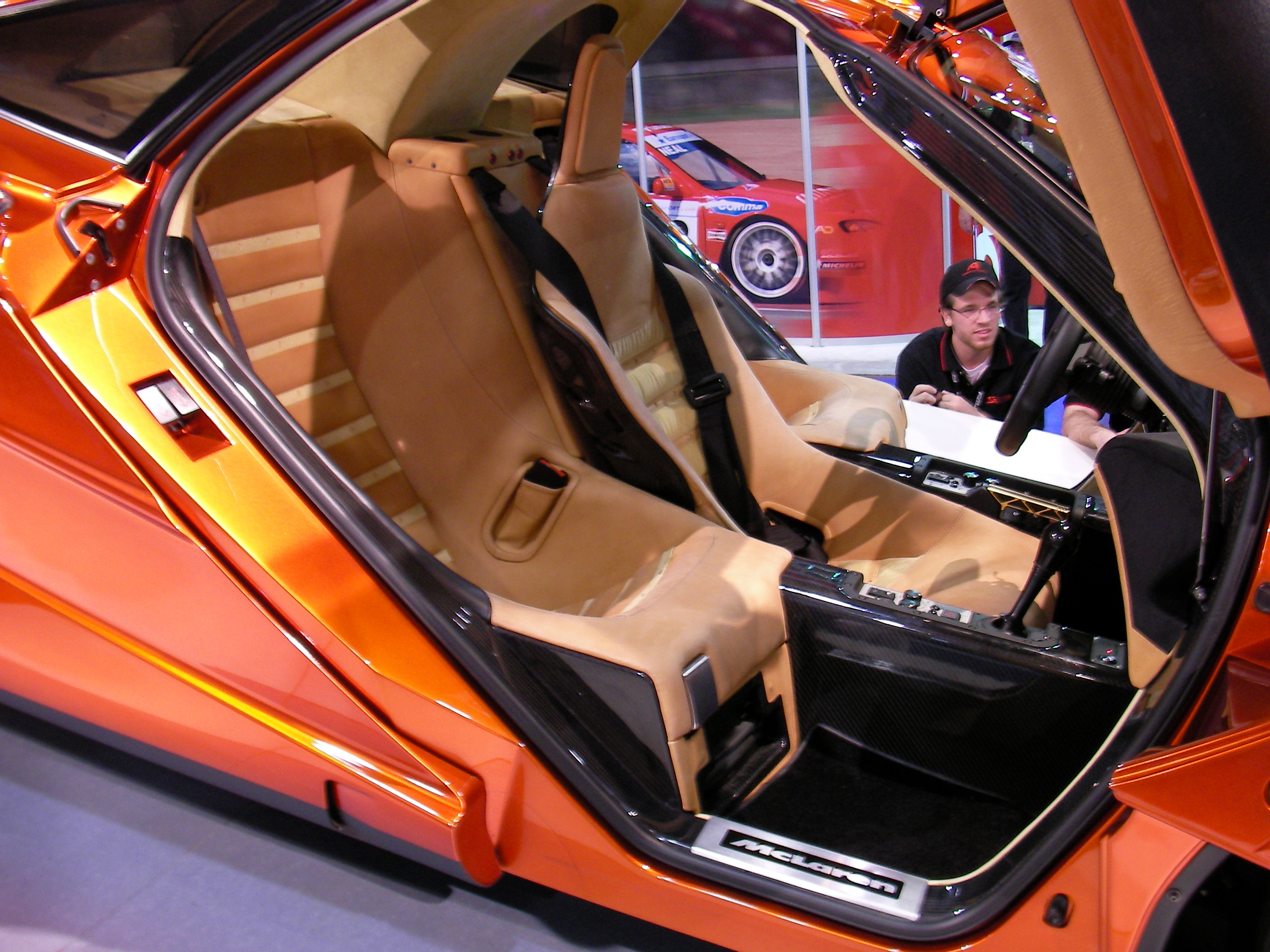
The offset three seat layout inside the F1's cabin

Gordon Murray had been thinking of a three-seat sports car since his youth. When Murray was waiting for a flight home from the Italian Grand Prix in 1988, he drew a sketch of a three-seater sports car and proposed it to Ron Dennis. He pitched the idea of creating the ultimate road car, a concept that would be heavily influenced by the company's Formula One experience and technology and thus reflect that skill and knowledge through the McLaren F1.

Murray declared that "During this time, we were able to visit Honda's Tochigi Research Centre with Ayrton Senna. The visit related to the fact that at the time, Honda powered McLaren's F1 Grand Prix chassis. Although it's true I had thought it would have been better to put a larger engine, the moment I drove the Honda NSX, all the benchmark cars—Ferrari, Porsche, Lamborghini—I had been using as references in the development of my car vanished from my mind. Of course, the car we would create, the McLaren F1, needed to be faster than the NSX, but the NSX's ride quality and handling would become our new design target. Being a fan of Honda engines, I later went to Honda's Tochigi Research Centre on two occasions and requested that they consider building for the McLaren F1 a 4.5-litre V10 or V12. I asked, I tried to persuade them, but in the end could not convince them to do it, and the McLaren F1 ended up equipped with a BMW engine."

A pair of Ultima MK3 kit cars, chassis numbers 12 and 13, "Albert" and "Edward", the last two MK3s, were used as "mules" to test various components and concepts before the first cars were built. Number 12 was used to test the gearbox with a 454 (7.4 L) Chevrolet V8, plus various other components such as the seats and the brakes. Number 13 was the test of the V12, plus the exhaust and cooling system. When McLaren was done with the cars they destroyed both of them to keep away the specialist magazines and because they did not want the car to be associated with "kit cars".

The car was first unveiled at a launch show, on 28 May 1992, at The Sporting Club in Monaco. The production version remained the same as the original prototype (XP1) except for the wing mirror which, on the XP1, was mounted at the top of the A-pillar. This car was deemed not road legal as it had no indicators at the front; McLaren was forced to make changes to the car as a result (some cars, including Ralph Lauren's, were sent back to McLaren and fitted with the prototype mirrors). The original wing mirrors also incorporated a pair of indicators which other car manufacturers would adopt several years later.

The car's safety levels were first proved during testing in Namibia in April 1993, when a test driver wearing just shorts and a T-shirt hit a rock and rolled the first prototype car several times, and still managed to escape unscathed. Later in the year, the second prototype (XP2) was specially built for crash testing and passed with the front wheel arch untouched.

=== Engine ===
==== History ====
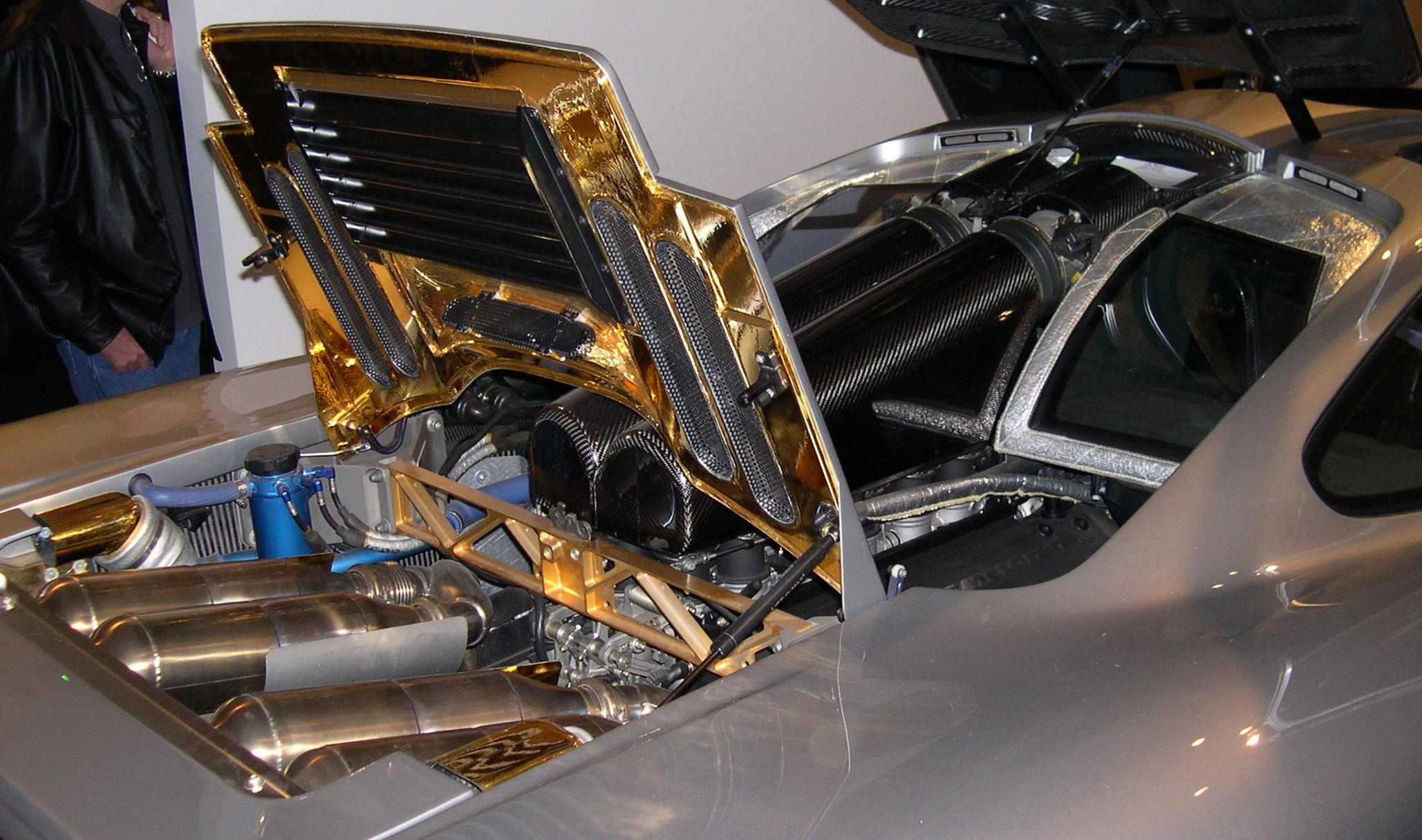
The McLaren F1's engine compartment contains the mid-mounted BMW S70/2 engine and uses gold foil as a heat shield in the exhaust compartment

Gordon Murray insisted that the engine for this car be naturally aspirated to increase reliability and driver control. Turbochargers and superchargers increase power but they increase complexity and can decrease reliability as well as introduce an additional aspect of latency and loss of feedback. The ability of the driver to maintain maximum control of the engine is thus compromised. Murray initially approached Honda for a power plant rated at 410 kW (550 hp; 557 PS), with 600 mm (23.6 in) of block length and a total weight of 250 kg (551 lb), it was required to be derived from the Formula One power plant in the then-dominating McLaren/Honda cars. When Honda refused, Isuzu, then planning an entry into Formula One, had a 3.5-litre V12 engine being tested in a Lotus chassis. The company was very interested in having the engine fitted into the F1. However, the designers wanted an engine with a proven design and a racing pedigree.

==== Specifications ====
Gordon Murray then approached BMW, which took an interest, and the motorsport division BMW M headed by engine expert Paul Rosche designed and built Murray a 6,064 cc (6.1 L; 370.0 cu in) 60º V12 engine called the BMW S70/2. At 461 kW (618 hp; 627 PS) and 266 kg (586 lb) the BMW engine ended up 14% more powerful and 16 kg (35 lb) heavier than Gordon Murray's original specifications, with the same block length.

It has an aluminium alloy block and heads, with bore x stroke of 86 mm × 87 mm (3.39 in × 3.43 in) DOHC with variable valve timing (a relatively new technology for the time) for maximum flexibility of control over the 4 valves per cylinder, and a chain drive for the camshafts.

The engine uses a dry sump oil lubrication system. The carbon fibre body panels and monocoque required significant thermal insulation in the engine compartment, so Murray's solution was to line the engine bay with a highly efficient heat-reflector: gold foil. Approximately 16 g (0.56 ounce) of gold was used in each car.

The road version of the engine used a compression ratio of 11:1 to produce a maximum power output of 461 kW (618 hp; 627 PS) at 7,400 rpm and 650 N⋅m (479 lb⋅ft) of torque at 5,600 rpm. The engine's rev limiter is set at 7,500 rpm. In contrast to raw engine power, a car's power-to-weight ratio is a better method of quantifying acceleration performance than the peak output of the vehicle's power plant. The standard F1 achieves 550 hp/ton (403 kW/tonne), or just 0.27 hp/lb.

The cam carriers, covers, oil sump, dry sump, and housings for the camshaft control are made of magnesium castings. The intake control features twelve individual butterfly valves, and the exhaust system has four Inconel catalysts with individual Lambda-Sondion controls. The camshafts are continuously variable for increased performance, using a system very closely based on BMW's VANOS variable valve timing system for the BMW M3; it is a hydraulically actuated phasing mechanism which retards the inlet cam relative to the exhaust cam at low revs, which reduces the valve overlap and provides for increased idle stability and increased low-speed torque. At higher rpm the valve overlap is increased by computer control to 42 degrees (compare to 25 degrees on the M3) for increased airflow into the cylinders and thus increased performance.

To allow the fuel to atomise fully, the engine uses two Lucas injectors per cylinder, with the first injector located close to the inlet valve – operating at low engine rpm – while the second is located higher up the inlet tract – operating at higher rpm. The dynamic transition between the two devices is controlled by the ECU. Each cylinder has its own miniature ignition coil. The closed-loop fuel injection is sequential. The engine has no knock sensor as the predicted combustion conditions would not cause this to be a problem. The pistons are forged in aluminium.

Every cylinder bore has a Nikasil coating giving it a high degree of wear resistance. From 1998 to 2000, the Le Mans–winning BMW V12 LMR sports car used a similar S70/2 engine. The engine was given a short development time, causing the BMW design team to use only trusted technology from prior design and implementation experience. The engine does not use titanium valves or connecting rods. Variable intake geometry was considered but rejected on grounds of unnecessary complication. As for fuel consumption, the engine achieves on average 15.2 mpg (15 L/100 km), at worst 9.3 mpg (25 L/100 km) and at best 23.4 mpg (10 L/100 km).

It was later revealed that BMW had used an E34 M5 Touring as a test mule in order to test the engine. The existence of such a test mule was revealed when David Clark, the director of McLaren road and race cars from 1994–1998 disclosed this fact to motoring journalist Chris Harris in a podcast. Clark also revealed that the prototype was kept out of the public eye and that BMW is still in possession of the prototype where it has been kept in their top-secret prototype storage facility.

=== Chassis and body ===
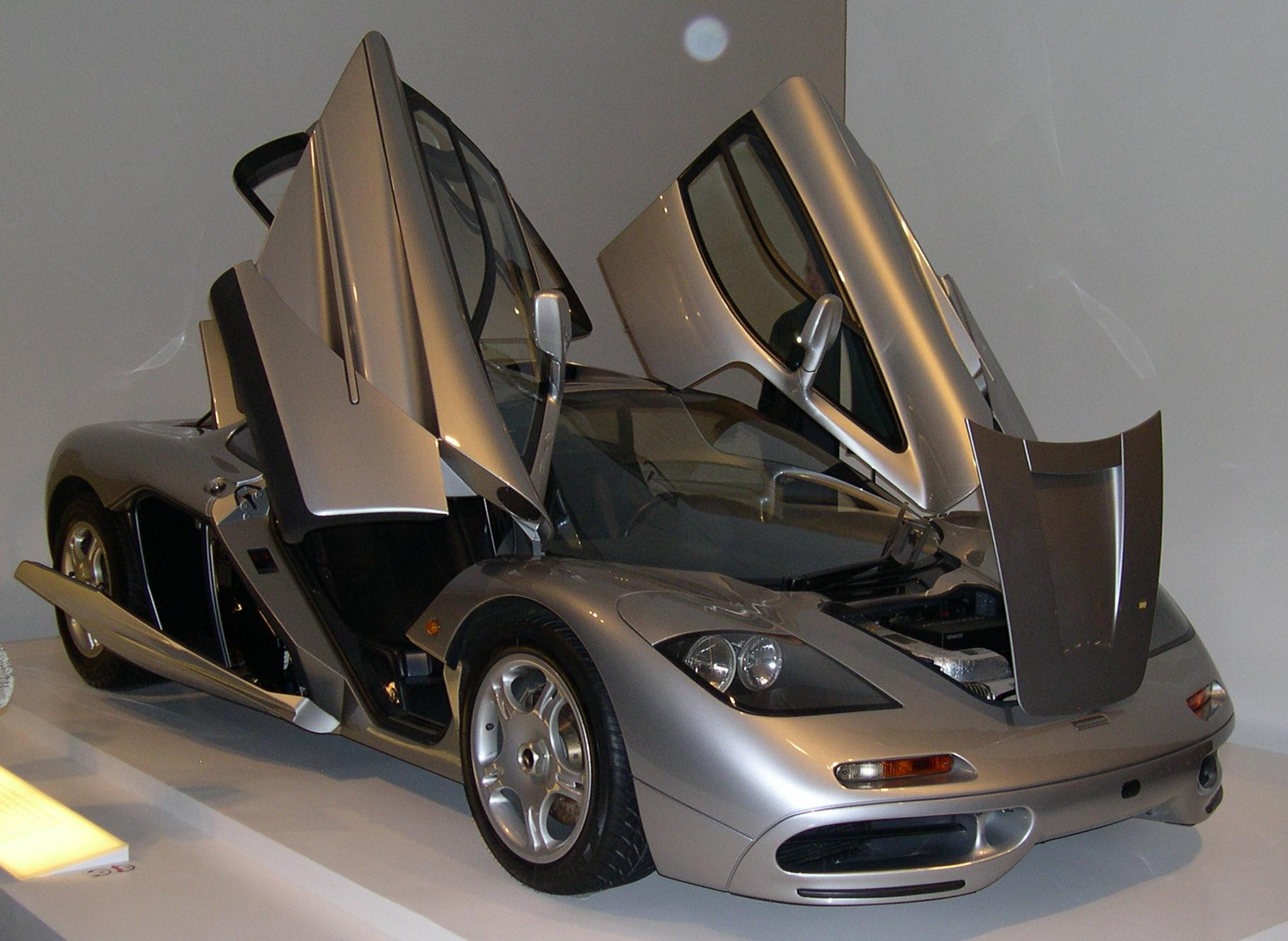
McLaren F1 with all user accessible compartments opened

The McLaren F1 was an early example of a production road car using a complete carbon fibre reinforced polymer (CFRP) monocoque chassis structure. Aluminium and magnesium were used for attachment points for the suspension system, inserted directly into the CFRP.

The car features a central driving position – the driver's seat is positioned in the middle of the car, ahead of the fuel tank and ahead of the engine, with a passenger seat slightly behind and on each side. The vehicle doors move up and out when opened and are thus of the butterfly or dihedral type. Gordon Murray's design for the doors was inspired by the Toyota Sera.

The engine produces high temperatures under full application and thus causes a high temperature variation in the engine bay from no operation to normal and full operation. CFRP becomes mechanically stressed over time from high heat transfer effects and thus the engine bay was not constructed from CFRP.

=== Aerodynamics ===
The overall drag coefficient on the standard McLaren F1 is Cd=0.32, compared with Cd=0.36 for the faster Bugatti Veyron, and Cd=0.357 for the SSC Ultimate Aero TT, which was the fastest production car from 2007 to 2010. The vehicle's frontal area is CdA=1.79 square metres (19.3 sq ft) and the S·Cd figure is 0.57. Because the McLaren F1 features active aerodynamics these are the figures presented in the most streamlined configuration.

The standard McLaren F1 road car features no fixed wing to produce downforce (compare to the LM and GTR editions); however, the overall design of the underbody of the McLaren F1 in addition to a rear diffuser exploits ground effect to improve downforce which is increased through the use of two electric Kevlar fans to further decrease the pressure under the car. A "high downforce mode" can be turned on and off by the driver. At the top of the vehicle, there is an air intake to direct high pressure air to the engine with a low pressure exit point at the top of the very rear. Under each door is a small air intake to provide cooling for the oil tank and some of the electronics. The airflow created by the electric fans not only increases downforce, but the airflow that is created is further exploited through design, by being directed through the engine bay to provide additional cooling for the engine and the ECU. At the front, there are ducts assisted by a Kevlar electric suction fan for cooling the front brakes.

There is a small dynamic rear spoiler on the tail of the vehicle, which deploys automatically under heavy braking to generate downforce and attempt to balance the centre of pressure of the car – which will be shifted forward when the brakes are applied. Upon activation of the spoiler, a high pressure zone is created in front of the flap, and this high pressure zone is exploited—two air intakes are revealed upon application that will allow the high pressure airflow to enter ducts that route air to aid in cooling the rear brakes. The spoiler increases the overall drag coefficient from Cd=0.32 to Cd=0.39 and is activated at speeds equal to or above 40 mph (64 km/h) by brake line pressure.

=== Suspension ===
Steve Randle, who was the car's dynamicist, was appointed responsible for the design of the suspension system of the McLaren F1. It was decided that the ride should be comfortable yet performance-oriented, but not as stiff and low as that of a true track machine, as that would imply a reduction in practical use and comfort as well as increasing noise and vibration, which would be a contradictory design choice in relation to the former set premise – the goal of creating the ultimate road car.

From inception, the design of the F1 had a strong focus on weight distribution by extensive manipulation of placement of, among other things, the engine, fuel and driver, allowing for a low polar moment of inertia in yaw. The F1 has 42% of its weight at the front and 58% at the rear, this figure changes less than 1% with the fuel load.

The distance between the mass centroid of the car and the suspension roll centre was designed to be the same front and rear to avoid unwanted weight transfer effects. Computer controlled dynamic suspension was considered but not applied due to the inherent increase in weight, complexity and loss of predictability of the vehicle.

Damper and spring specifications: 90 mm (3.5 in) bump, 80 mm (3.1 in) rebound with bounce frequency at 1.41 Hz at the front and 1.75 Hz at the rear. Despite being sports oriented, these figures imply a soft ride and inherently decrease track performance. As can be seen from the McLaren F1 LM and the McLaren F1 GTR track variants, the track performance potential is much higher than that in the standard F1 road car due to the fact that the car should be comfortable and usable in everyday conditions.

The suspension is a double wishbone system with an unusual design. Longitudinal wheel compliance is included without loss of wheel control, which allows the wheel to travel backwards when it hits a bump – increasing the comfort of the ride.

Caster wind-off at the front during braking is handled by McLaren's proprietary Ground Plane Shear Centre – the wishbones on either side in the subframe are fixed in rigid plane bearings and connected to the body by four independent bushings which are 25 times more stiff radially than axially. This solution provides for a caster wind-off measured to 1.02 degrees per g of braking deceleration. Compare the Honda NSX at 2.91 degrees per g, the Porsche 928 S at 3.60 degrees per g and the Jaguar XJ6 at 4.30 degrees per g respectively. The difference in toe and camber values is also very small under lateral force application. The Inclined Shear Axis is used at the rear of the machine and provides measurements of 0.04 degrees per g of change in toe-in under braking and 0.08 degrees per g of toe-out under traction.

When developing the suspension system, the facility of electro-hydraulic kinematics and compliance at AB Dynamics was employed to measure the performance of the suspension on a Jaguar XJR16, a Porsche 928 S and a Honda NSX to use as references.

Steering knuckles and the top wishbone/bell crank are also specially manufactured in an aluminium alloy. The wishbones are machined from a solid aluminium alloy with CNC machines.

=== Tyres ===
The McLaren F1 uses 235/45ZR17 front tyres and 315/45ZR17 rear tyres. These are specially designed and developed solely for the McLaren F1 by Goodyear, Michelin, Avon and Pirelli. The tyres are mounted on 17 by 9 in (431.8 by 228.6 mm) front, and 17 by 11.5 in (431.8 by 292.1 mm) rear five-spoke cast magnesium wheels, coated with a protective paint and secured by magnesium retention pins.

The turning circle from kerb to kerb is 13 m (42.7 ft), allowing the driver 2.8 turns from lock to lock.

=== Brakes ===
The F1 features unassisted, vented and cross-drilled brake discs made by Brembo. The Front size is 332 mm (13.1 in) and the rear 305 mm (12.0 in). The calipers are all four-pot, opposed piston types, and are made of aluminium. The rear brake calipers do not feature any handbrake functionality, however there is a mechanically actuated, fist-type calipers which is computer controlled and thus serve as a handbrake.

To increase caliper stiffness, the calipers are machined from a single solid piece of metal (in contrast to the more common being bolted together from two halves). Pedal travel is slightly over one inch. Activation of the rear spoiler will allow the air pressure generated at the back of the vehicle to force air into the cooling ducts located at either end of the spoiler which become uncovered upon application of it.

Servo-assisted ABS brakes were ruled out as they would imply increased mass, complexity and reduced brake feel; however, at the cost of increasing the required skill of the driver.

Gordon Murray attempted to utilise carbon brakes for the F1, but found the technology to be not advanced enough at the time; with one of the major culprits being that of a proportional relationship between brake disc temperature and friction—i.e. stopping power—thus resulting in relatively poor brake performance without an initial warm-up of the brakes before use. Since carbon brakes have a more simplified application envelope in pure racing environments, this allows for the racing edition of the car, the F1 GTR, to feature ceramic carbon brakes.

=== Gearbox and powertrain ===
The standard McLaren F1 has a transverse 6-speed manual gearbox with an AP carbon triple-plate clutch contained in an aluminium housing. The gearbox was developed in collaboration with Weismann transmissions in California. The second generation GTR edition has a magnesium housing. Both the standard edition and the 'McLaren F1 LM' have the following gear ratios: 3.23:1, 2.19:1, 1.71:1, 1.39:1, 1.16:1, 0.93:1, with a final drive of 2.37:1, although the final gear is offset from the side of the clutch. The Torsen Limited Slip Differential has a 40% lock. The sixth gear ratio allows for a longer cruise at 53 km/h (33 mph) per 1000 rpm.

The McLaren F1 has an aluminium flywheel that has only the dimensions and mass absolutely needed to allow the torque from the engine to be transmitted. This is done in order to decrease rotational inertia and increase the responsiveness of the drivetrain, resulting in faster gear changes and better throttle feedback. This is possible due to the F1 engine lacking secondary vibrational couples and featuring a torsional vibration damper by BMW.

=== Interior and equipment ===
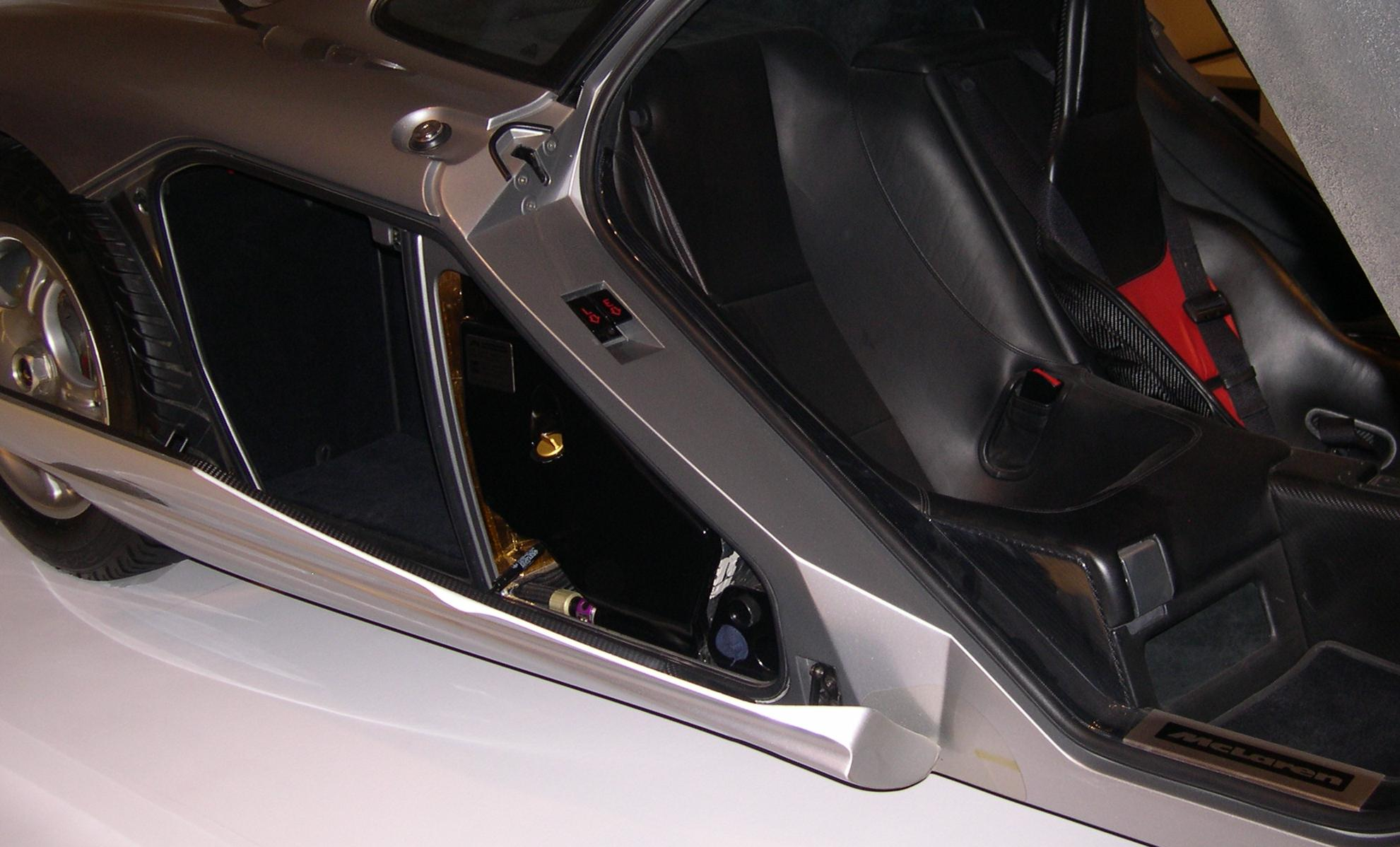
1996 McLaren F1 side luggage compartment

Standard equipment for the McLaren F1 includes full cabin air conditioning, a rarity on most sports cars and a system design which Murray again credited to the Honda NSX, a car he had owned and driven himself for 7 years without ever needing to change the AC automatic setting. Further comfort features included SeKurit electric defrost/demist windscreen and side glass, electric window lifts, remote central locking, Kenwood 10-disc CD stereo system, cabin access release for opening panels, cabin storage compartment, four-lamp high performance headlight system, rear fog and reversing lights, courtesy lights in all compartments, map reading lights and a gold-plated Facom titanium tool kit and first aid kit (both stored in the car). In addition, tailored, proprietary luggage bags specially designed to fit the vehicle's carpeted storage compartments, including a tailored golf bag, were standard equipment. Airbags are not present in the car. Each customer was given a special edition TAG Heuer 6000 Chronometer wristwatch with its serial number scripted below the centre stem.

All features of the F1 were, according to Gordon Murray, obsessed over, including the interior. The metal plates fitted to improve the aesthetics of the cockpit are claimed to be 20 thousandths of an inch (0.5 mm) thick to save weight. The driver's seat of the McLaren F1 is custom fitted to the specifications desired by the customer for optimal fit and comfort; the seats are handmade from CFRP and covered in light Connolly leather. By design, the F1 steering column cannot be adjusted; however, prior to production each customer specifies the exact preferred position of the steering wheel and thus the steering column is tailored by default to those owner settings. The same holds true for the pedals, which are not adjustable after the car has left the factory but are tailored to each specific customer.

During its pre-production stage, McLaren commissioned Kenwood, the team's supplier of radio equipment, to create a lightweight car audio system for the car; Kenwood, between 1992 and 1998 used the F1 to promote its products in print advertisements, calendars and brochure covers. Each car's audio system was specially designed to tailor to an individual's listening taste; however, radio was omitted because Murray felt it wasn't necessary.

=== Purchase and maintenance ===
Only 106 cars were manufactured: 5 prototypes (XP1, XP2, XP3, XP4, XP5), 64 road versions (F1), 1 tuned developmental prototype (XP1 LM), 5 tuned versions (LM), 1 longtail developmental prototype (XPGT), 2 longtail versions (GT), and 28 racecars (GTR). Production began in 1992 and ended in 1998. At the time of production, each car took around three and a half months to make.

Although production stopped in 1998, McLaren still maintains an extensive support and service network for the F1. Every standard F1 has a modem which allows customer care to remotely fetch information from the ECU of the car in order to assist the customer in the event of a mechanical vehicle failure. There are eight authorised service centres throughout the world, and McLaren will on occasion fly a specialised technician to the owner of the car or the service centre. All of the technicians have undergone dedicated training in service of the McLaren F1. In cases where major structural damage has occurred, the car can be returned to McLaren directly for repair.

=== Performance ===
The F1 remains one of the fastest production cars ever made; as of October 2018, it is outmatched by very few cars (such as the Bugatti Veyron and the Bugatti Chiron).

However, all of the higher top speed machines use forced induction to reach their respective top speeds, whereas the McLaren F1 is naturally aspirated. To date the F1 holds the record for fastest naturally aspirated production car, a record it has held for almost 30 years.

==== Braking and handling ====
- 30–0 mph (48–0 km/h): 9.7 m / 31.83 ft
- 50–0 mph (80–0 km/h): 25.2 m / 82.68 ft
- 70–0 mph (112–0 km/h): 49 m / 162 ft
- Skidpad Lateral Acceleration: 1.2–1.3g

==== Track tests ====
- Tsukuba Circuit, time trial: 1:04.62 (Driven by Naoki Hattori in Best Motoring) on a hot lap with humid (92%) weather and some mis-shifting.
- Millbrook Proving Ground in Bedfordshire, 2-mile (3.2 km) banked circuit, top speed test: An average speed of 195.3 mph (314.3 km/h), with a maximum speed of 200.8 mph (323.2 km/h) (driven by Tiff Needell using the XP5 prototype).
- MIRA Proving Ground, 2.82-mile (4.54 km) banked circuit, top speed test: An average speed of 168 mph (270 km/h), with a maximum speed of 196.2 mph (315.8 km/h) (driven by Peter Taylor).
- Bedford Autodrome West Circuit Post 2006 Hot Lap: 1:21.20 done by Evo magazine with a custom modified McLaren F1 (with the same tyres as the Enzo) on 10 January 2007 which was faster than the Ferrari Enzo lap time of 1:21.30
- Estoril circuit lap is 1:55.9 in 1994 (4.36 km) configuration of the track with 3 people on board in July 1994.
- The 1st lap of Nurburgring was completed by Jonathan Palmer in the XP4 prototype, where he reached a maximum of 200 mph (322 km/h) on the track.

== Record claims ==
In August 1993, McLaren tested the XP3 prototype – which was limited to 433 kW (581 hp; 589 PS) – at the Nardò Ring. They calculated a top speed of 231 mph (372 km/h) from the data recording inside the car.

The British magazine Autocar was given access and tested the XP5 prototype in May 1994. They wrote: "Had we enough tarmac, we have no doubt that it would finally stop accelerating at its rev-limiter in top which, taking tyre growth into account, would be somewhere the far side of 230 mph (370 km/h)."

Car and Driver wrote in their August 1994 issue ("Courtesy of Autocar & Motor" written in the box with performance numbers): "Top speed? The F1 runs into the 7,500 rpm redline in sixth at 221 mph (356 km/h) but it's still accelerating. Gordon Murray, the F1's designer, is convinced that with taller gearing, the car is capable of at least 230 mph (370 km/h)."

On 31 March 1998, Andy Wallace drove the five-year-old XP5 prototype at Volkswagen's test track in Ehra-Lessien, setting a new production car world record. The record consisted of an independently measured 240.1 mph (386.4 km/h) two-way average with the peak speed of 243 mph (391 km/h) measured by McLaren with the rev-limiter raised to 8,300 rpm.

As of 2022, the F1 remains the fastest naturally aspirated production car in the world, a record that has been held for 24 years. Although its speed record has been passed, the cars that have surpassed it use forced induction engines.

== Motorsports ==
Following its initial launch as a road car, motorsports teams convinced McLaren to build racing versions of the F1 to compete in international series. Three different versions of the race car were developed from 1995 to 1997.

Some of the F1 GTRs, after the cars were no longer eligible for international racing series, were converted to street use. By adding mufflers, and passenger seats, adjusting the suspension for more ground clearance for public streets, and removing the air-restrictors, the cars were able to be registered for road use.

=== F1 GTR 1995 ===
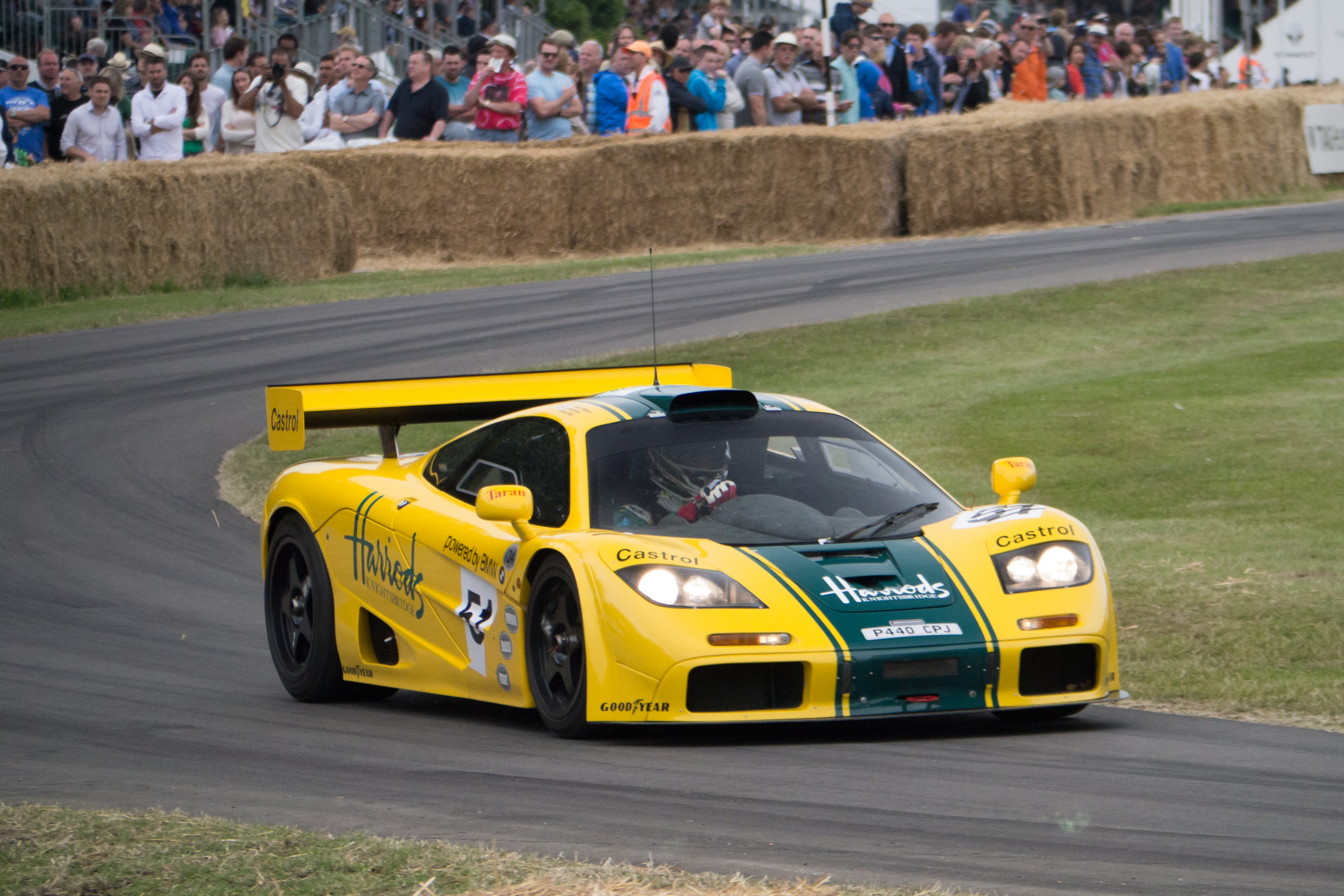
A 1995-spec F1 GTR, chassis #006R at the Goodwood Festival of Speed sporting the famous 'Harrods' livery

Built at the request of race teams, such as those owned by Ray Bellm and Thomas Bscher, in order to compete in the BPR Global GT Series, the McLaren F1 GTR was a custom-built race car which introduced a modified engine management system that increased power output – however, air-restrictors mandated by racing regulations reduced the power back to 441 kW (591 hp; 600 PS) at 7,500 rpm. The car's list of modifications included changes to body panels, suspension, aerodynamics and the interior. The F1 GTR would go on to take its greatest achievement with first, third, fourth, fifth, and 13th places in the 1995 24 Hours of Le Mans, beating out custom built prototype sports cars. When Mark Blundell – who finished fourth in the race – was asked what the F1 GTR was like to drive during the wet race, he said: "Well it was never designed to be a race car so in many respects it wasn't the best-balanced car in the world. The saving grace of the car was the BMW V12 engine. It was incredibly impressive in that you could be in 6th gear at 2,000 rpm and the thing would just pull like a train. And in the wet that is great as you can run a higher gear and it cuts out some of that traction issue. But in terms of balance, overall it was always a bit top heavy, so the centre of gravity wasn’t ideal. And aerodynamically it wasn't quite there, but it did the job".

In total, nine F1 GTRs were built for the 1995 season.

The 1995 F1 GTR created so much downforce that it was claimed to be able to drive upside down along a ceiling at 100 mph (161 km/h).

=== F1 GTR 1996 ===
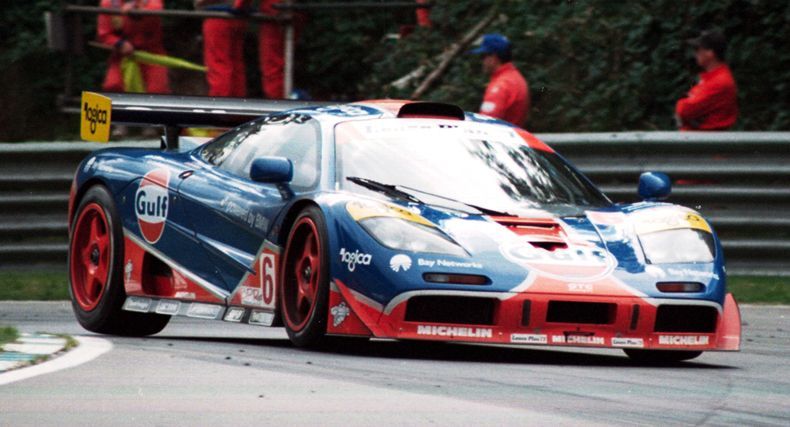
A 1996-spec F1 GTR, chassis #015R at the Brands Hatch circuit

To follow up on the success of the F1 GTR in 1996, McLaren further developed the 1995 model, leading to a size increase but a weight decrease. Nine more F1 GTRs were built to 1996 spec, while some 1995 cars were still campaigned by privateers. F1 GTR 1996 chassis #14R is notable as being the first non-Japanese car to win a race in the All-Japan Grand Touring Car Championship (JGTC). The car was driven by David Brabham and John Nielsen. The weight was reduced by around 37 kg (82 lb) from the 1995 GTR but the engine was kept de-tuned at 447 kW (599 hp; 608 PS) to comply with racing regulations.

=== F1 GTR 1997 ===
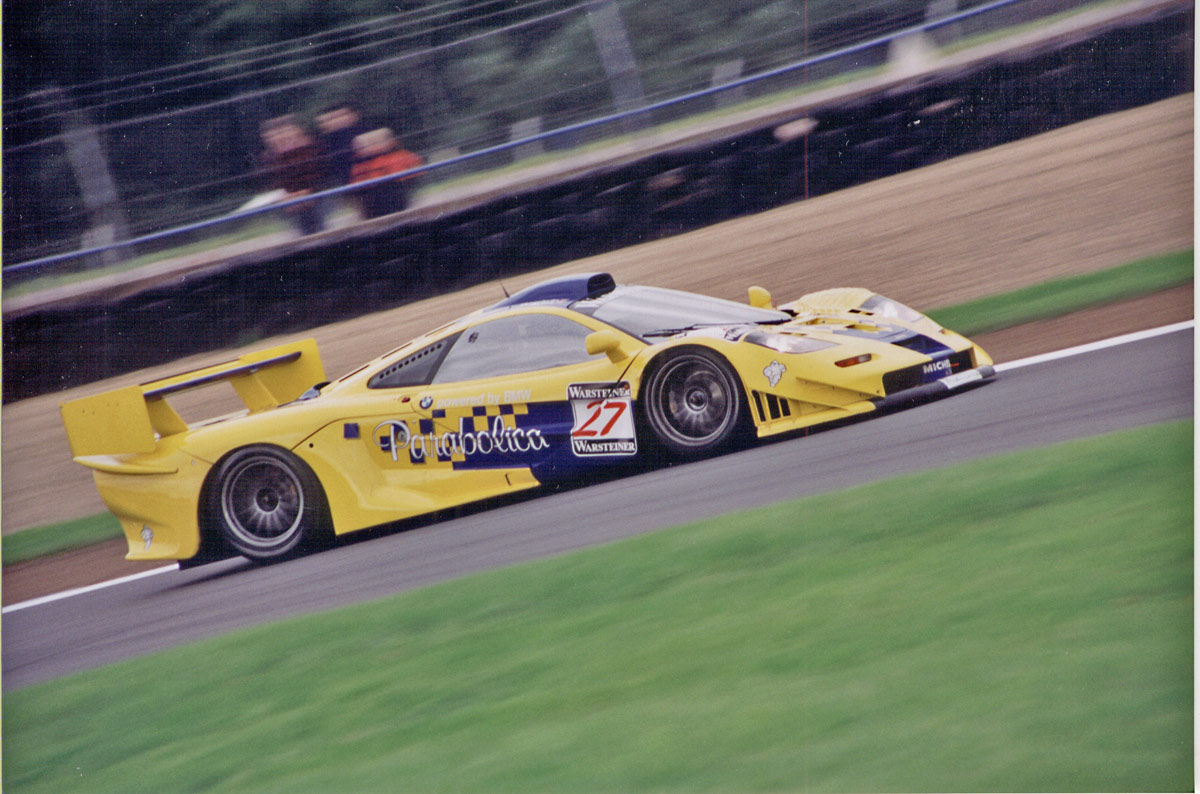
A 1997-spec F1 GTR "Long Tail", chassis #027R of Parabolica Motorsports during an FIA GT Championship event

With three F1 GT homologation street versions produced, McLaren could now develop the F1 GTR for the 1997 season. Weight was further reduced and a sequential gearbox was added. The engine was slightly destroked to 6.0 L instead of the previous 6.1 L. Due to the heavily modified bodywork, the F1 GTR 1997 is often referred to as the "Longtail" thanks to the rear bodywork being extended to increase downforce. A total of ten F1 GTRs were built for the 1997 season. The weight was reduced to a total of 910 kg (2,006 lb).

== Variants ==
Total production
Variant	Road	Prototype	Race	Total
F1	62	5		67
F1 LM	5	1		6
F1 GT	2	1		3
F1 HDK	2			2
F1 GTR			28	28
Total	71	7	28	106

The McLaren F1 road car, of which 64 were originally sold, saw several different modifications over its production span which were badged as different models. The company maintains a database to match up prospective sellers and buyers of the cars.

=== Prototypes ===
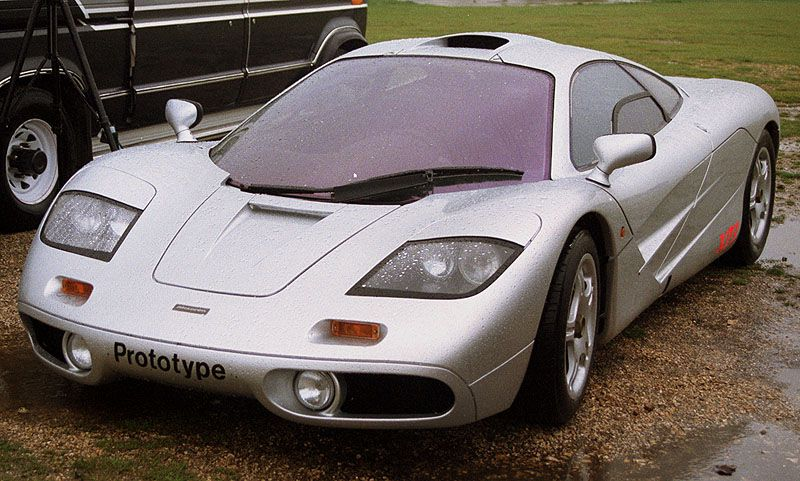
McLaren XP3 prototype, photographed during testing in 1993. The car was owned by Gordon Murray. Notice the fog lights integrated in the front bumper and narrower turn signals than the production version along with the wing mirrors sourced from a Citroën CX. The fog lights were removed and the wing mirrors were later replaced by production units.

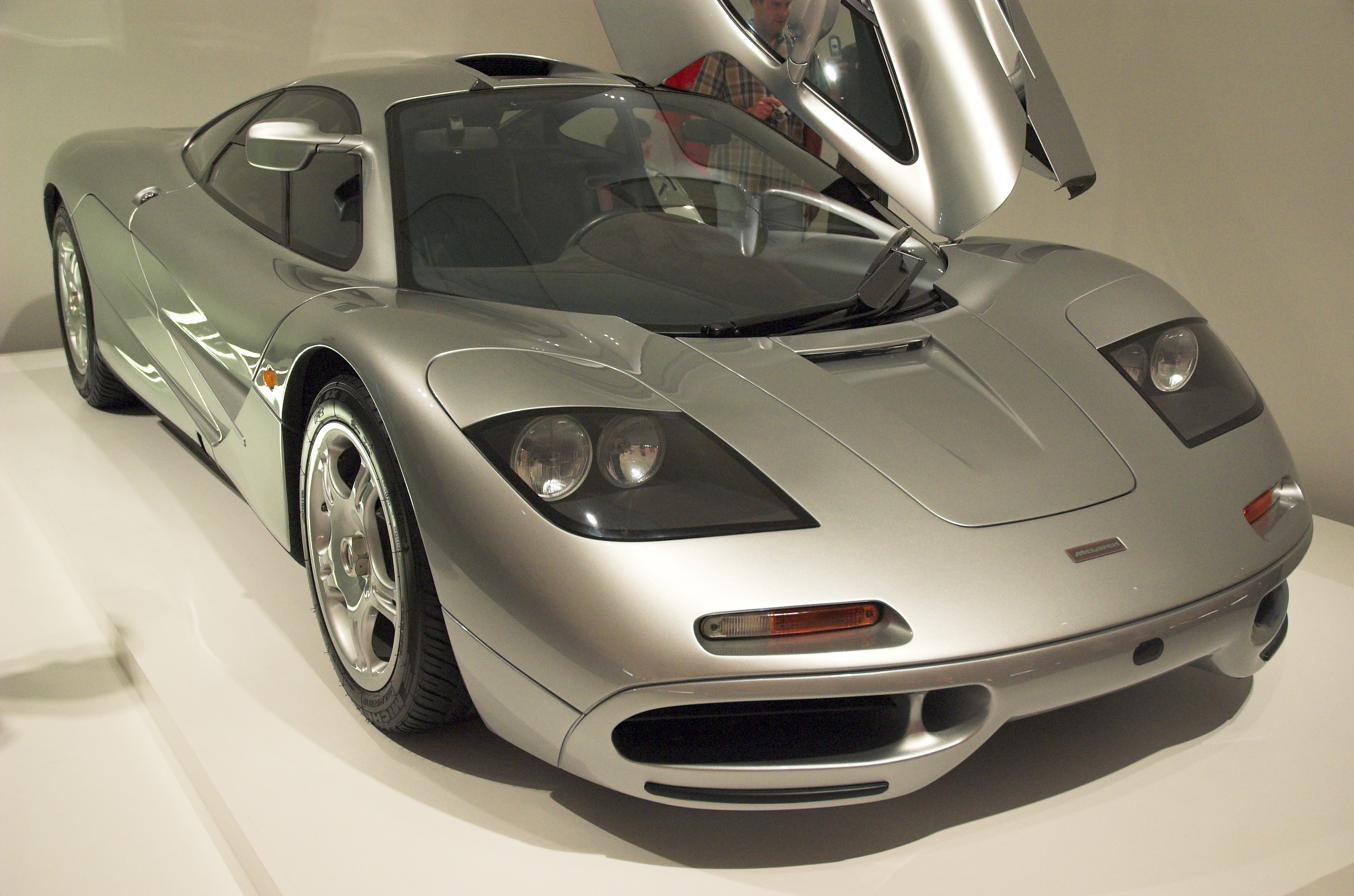
A McLaren F1 with the wing mirrors mounted on the A-pillar as on the prototypes

Prior to the sale of the first McLaren F1s, five prototypes were built, carrying the numbers XP1 through XP5. These cars carried minor subtle differences between each other as well as between the production road cars. Contrary to common misunderstanding, XP1, the first ever running prototype, was never publicly unveiled. The XP1 was never painted (with a bare carbon fibre exterior) and was later destroyed in an accident in Namibia. The car unveiled at the Monaco 1992 event was actually a "Clinic Model", aesthetically convincing but without a powertrain. XP2 was used for crash testing (sporting a blue colour during the test) and also destroyed. As it was a crash test car, it didn't have full interior equipment or a powertrain. XP3 did durability testing, XP4 stress tested the gearbox system and XP5 was a publicity car. The XP3 used to be owned by Gordon Murray before being sold to a private buyer. XP4 was seen by viewers of Top Gear when reviewed by Tiff Needell in the mid-1990s and later on sold to a private owner, while XP5 went on to be used in McLaren's famous top speed run and is still owned by McLaren.

=== Ameritech ===
Seven McLaren F1s were imported by Ameritech and modified in order to be federalized for road use in the United States. These modifications include the deletion of side seats, the replacement of headlights, a heightened bumper and dampened performance figures including handling and braking compared to the European F1, due to road legality issues. It weighs in at 1,288.2 kg (2,840 lb).

==== Performance ====
Performance figures are lower than a regular F1 in all aspects (apart from 0–30 mph (0–48 km/h)) relating to performance. As Mario Andretti noted in a top speed comparison test after hitting the rev limiter at 217.7 mph (350.4 km/h) on Ameritech F1, the Ameritech F1 is fully capable of pulling a seventh gear, thus with a higher gear ratio or a seventh gear the car would probably be able to reach an even greater top speed.

=== F1 LM ===
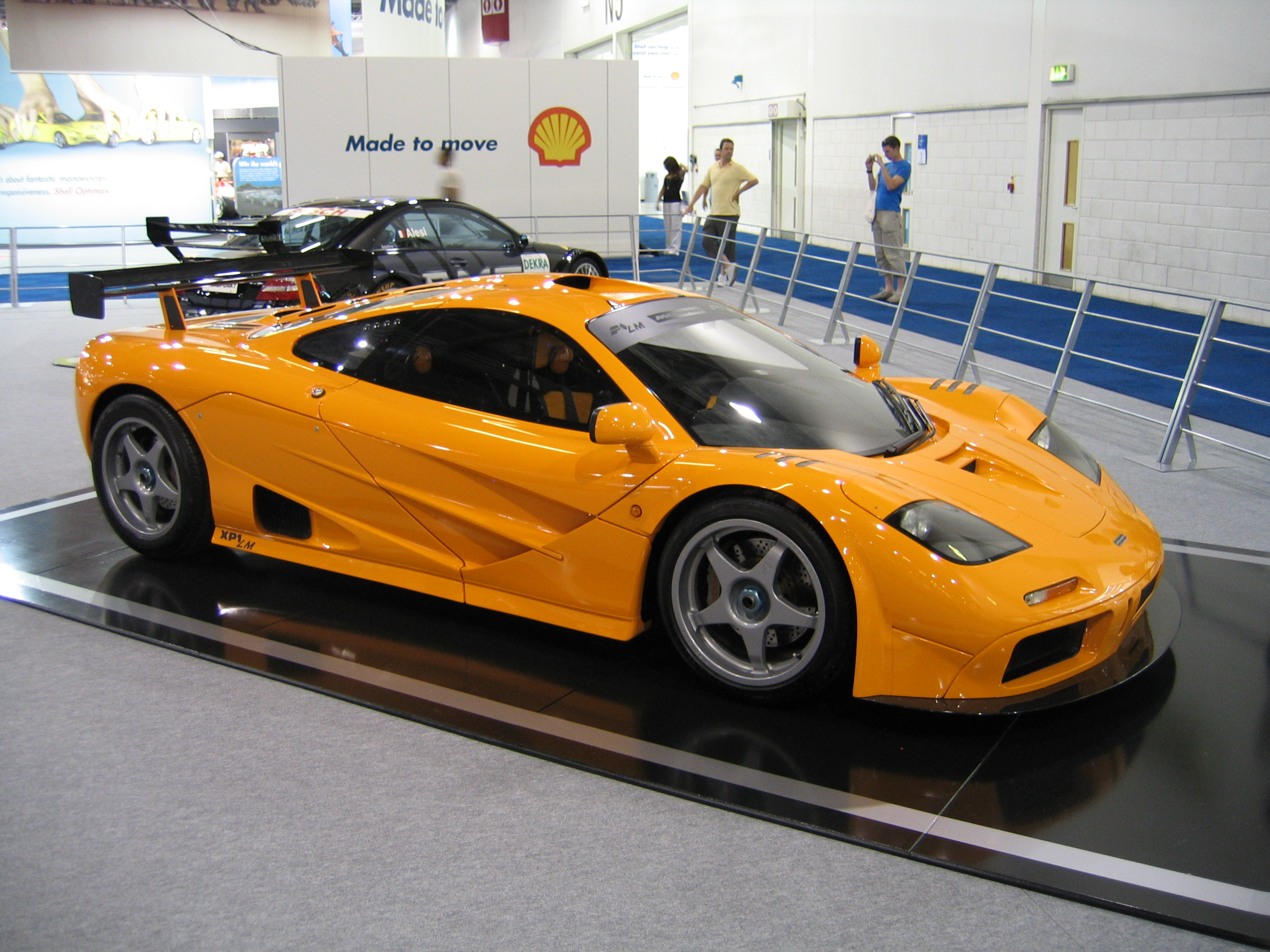
The McLaren F1 XP1 LM prototype on display

The McLaren F1 LM (LM for Le Mans) is a series of five special cars which were built in honour of the five McLaren F1 GTRs which finished the 1995 24 Hours of Le Mans, including the winning car.

The weight was reduced by approximately 76 kg (167.6 lb) to a total of 1,062 kg (2,341 lb) – achieved by having no interior noise suppression, no audio system, a stripped-down base interior, no fan-assisted ground effect and no dynamic rear wing. The car also had a different transaxle, various aerodynamic modifications, specially designed 18 in (457.2 mm) magnesium alloy wheels and an upgraded gearbox. The F1 LM used the same engine as the 1995 F1 GTR, but without race-mandated restrictors, to produce 500 kW (671 hp; 680 PS). It had a top speed of 225 mph (362 km/h), which is less than the standard version because of added aerodynamic drag, despite identical gear ratios. In the place of the small dynamic rear wing, there is a considerably larger, fixed CFRP rear wing mounted on the back of the vehicle.

The LM has the following specifications:

- Peak torque of 705 N⋅m (520 lbf⋅ft) at 4,500 rpm
- Peak power of 500 kW (671 hp; 680 PS) at 7,800 rpm
- A redline at 8,500 rpm
- Total weight of 1,062 kg (2,341 lb) which gives the car an 82.15 kW (110 hp; 112 PS) per litre ratio.

While McLaren has never claimed specific acceleration figures for the LM, Motor Trend recorded traction-limited times of 0–60 mph in 3.9 seconds and 0–100 mph in 6.7 seconds. The LM was once the holder of the 0–100–0 mph record, which it completed in 11.5 seconds when driven by Andy Wallace at the disused airbase RAF Alconbury in Cambridgeshire.

The F1 LMs can be identified by their Papaya Orange paint. They were painted in this colour in memory of, and tribute to, Bruce McLaren, whose race colour was Papaya Orange. Two of the chassis were painted in Black with Grey trim similar to the Ueno Clinic sponsored Le Mans 24 Hours winning car. These cars were bought by the Sultan of Brunei and, as such, also feature horizontal stripes down the sides in yellow, red and blue.

Although only five F1 LMs were sold, a sixth chassis exists in the form of XP1 LM, the prototype for modifications to the existing F1 to form the new F1 LM. This car is also painted Papaya Orange and is retained by McLaren.

=== F1 High Downforce Kit (HDK) ===
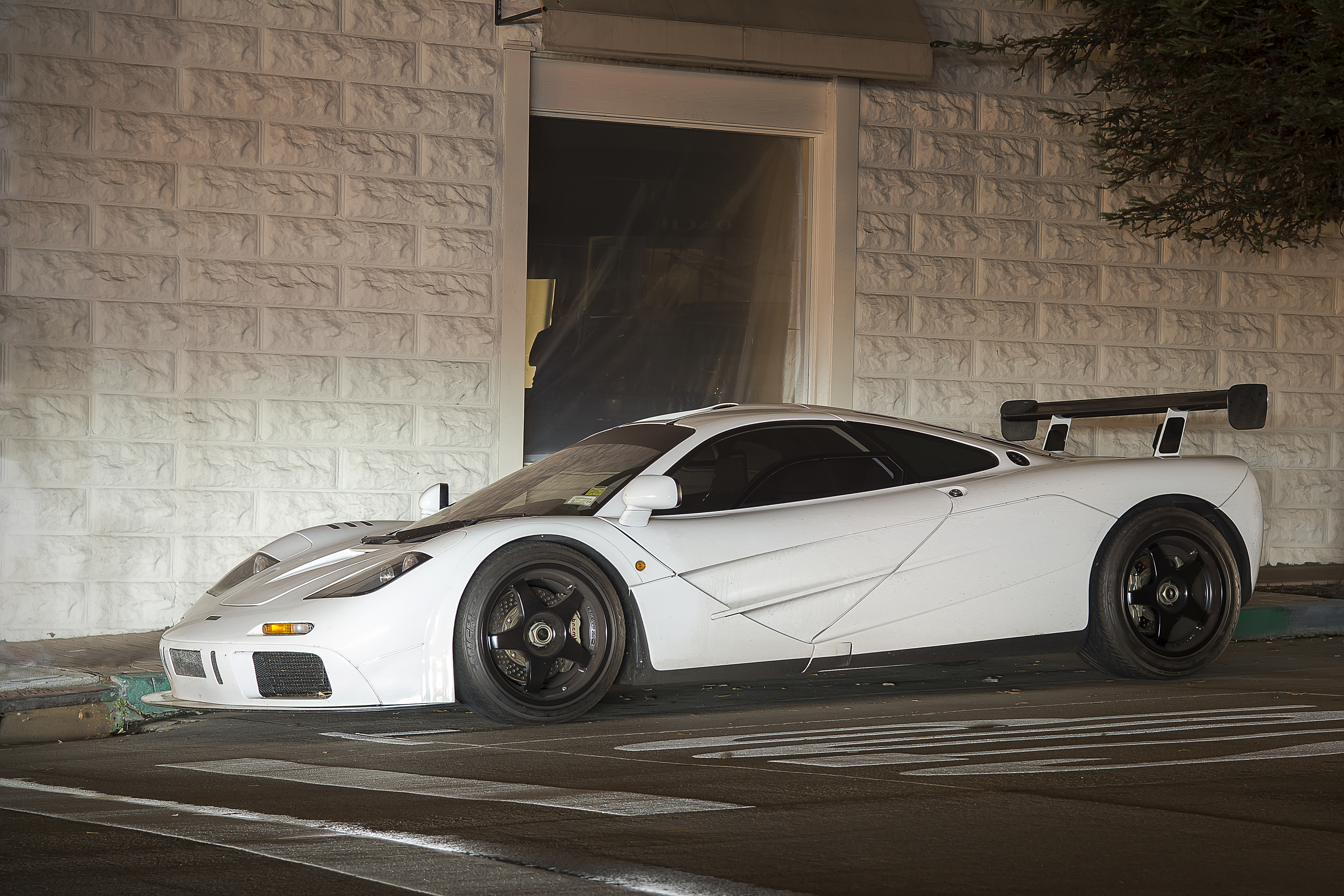
McLaren F1 HDK chassis number 14

Two standard F1s were upgraded to "LM specification". These have chassis numbers 073 and 018. The engines were upgraded to unrestricted GTR specification resulting in a power output of 500 kW (671 hp; 680 PS) and had the High Downforce Kit (HDK) added to them. Their interiors were made more comfortable over the F1 LM. The car having chassis number 018 had upgrades to the air conditioning units, the headlamps changed to a gas discharge type and the steering wheel changed to a 14-inch unit. Moreover, race specification dampers and springs set to the softest settings for comfortable road use were added. 18-inch GTR wheels were used instead of the standard 17-inch and the tyres used are Michelin Pilot Sport units.

=== F1 GT ===
McLaren F1 GT
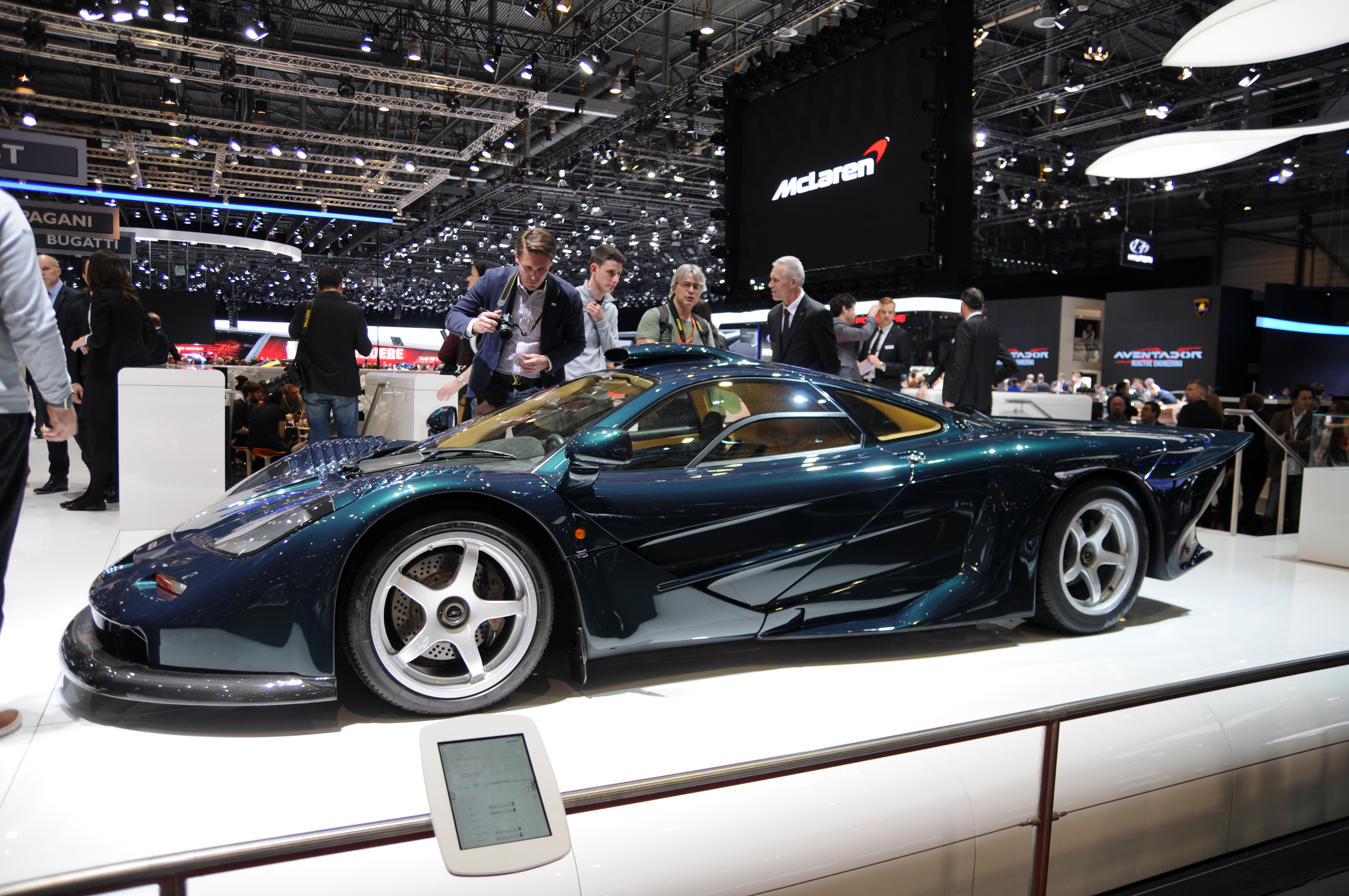
- The McLaren F1 GT developmental prototype (chassis #056XP) at the 2015 Geneva Motor Show

Overview
- Manufacturer: McLaren Cars
- Production: 1997; 3 produced (2 production cars and 1 developmental prototype)
- Assembly: United Kingdom: Woking, Surrey, England
- Designer: Gordon Murray; Peter Stevens; Paul Rosche (engine designer) (BMW)

Body and chassis
- Class: Sports car (S)
- Body style: 2-door coupé
- Layout: Rear mid-engine, rear-wheel-drive
- Platform: McLaren F1
- Related: McLaren F1 GTR

Powertrain
- Engine: 6.1 L BMW S70/2 V12
- Transmission: 6-speed manual

Dimensions
- Wheelbase: 2,718 mm (107.0 in)
- Length: 4,928 mm (194.0 in)
- Width: 1,940 mm (76.4 in)
- Height: 1,200 mm (47.2 in)
- Kerb weight: 1,120 kg (2,469 lb)

The final and rarest incarnation of the road car, the F1 GT was meant as a homologation special. With increased competition from homologated sports cars from Porsche and Mercedes-Benz in the former BPR Global GT Series and the new FIA GT Championship, McLaren required extensive modification to the F1 GTR in order to remain as competitive. These modifications were so vast that McLaren would be required to build a production road-legal car on which the new race cars would be based.

The F1 GT featured the same extended rear bodywork as the GTRs for increased downforce and reduced drag yet lacked the rear wing that had been seen on the F1 LM. The downforce generated by the longer tail was found to be sufficient to not require the wing. The front end was also similar to the racing car, with extra louvres and the wheel arches widened to fit larger wheels. The interior was modified, and a racing steering wheel was included in place of the standard unit.

The F1 GTs were built from standard F1 road car chassis, retaining their production numbers. The developmental prototype GT, known as XPGT, was F1 chassis #056XP, was painted dark green ("Silverstone green") and is owned by a private collector in Switzerland. The company technically only needed to build one car and did not even have to sell it. However, demand from customers drove McLaren to build two production versions that were sold; the customer F1 GTs were chassis #054 and #058. #054 was painted black and was owned by the brother of the Sultan of Brunei, Prince Jefri Bolkiah, and up until Prince Abdul Mateen acquired it in recent years, he had the example flown to the UK for maintenance at McLaren Special Operations in 2022. It was flown back to Brunei a year later, where it is now repainted in a dark blue colour and was reportedly spotted on a tow truck under a car cover. Chassis #058 was painted burgundy and is owned by the ZAZ Museum in Japan. It weighs 1,120 kg (2,469 lb), 20 kg (44 lb) lighter than the standard F1 and has a top speed of over 240 mph (386 km/h), although this was never tested.

== Chassis numbers ==
For F1 GTR numbers, see McLaren F1 GTR

Number	Model	Note	Paint
XP1	F1 prototype	Destroyed during testing in a crash in Namibia.	Unpainted carbon fibre
XP2	F1 prototype	Crash test vehicle.	Blue
XP3	F1 prototype	Previously owned by Gordon Murray.	Silver
XP4	F1 prototype		Dark Metallic Grey
XP5	F1 prototype	Used to set world record for fastest production car.	Dark Metallic Green
001	F1		Magnesium Silver
002	F1	Owned by royal family of Brunei. First production F1.	Dorchester Grey
003	F1	Sold to McLaren CEO Ron Dennis.	Carbon
004	F1	Destroyed in a crash. Sold to royal family of Brunei.	Gran Prix Red
005	F1	Sold to a UK customer, later sold by DK Engineering.	Jet Black
006	F1	Sold to a customer in Japan, later sold to a customer in Bahrain.	Magnesium Silver, later repainted Piano Black
007	F1		Jet Black
008	F1	Owned by royal family of Brunei.	Cobalt Blue
009	F1	Crashed twice and repaired.	Magnesium Silver
010	F1	Destroyed in a crash.	Magnesium Silver
011	F1	Retrofitted with High Downforce Kit.	Carbon, later repainted blue
012	F1	Sold to Tag Heuer Japan.	Dark Silver with Tag Heuer decals
013	F1		Magnesium Silver
014	F1	Previously owned by royal family of Brunei. Retrofitted with High Downforce Kit. Sold at auction for $25,317,500 in 2025.	Titanium Yellow, later repainted white
015	F1	Owned by Jay Leno.	Jet Black
016	F1		Aubergine
017	F1	Destroyed in a crash.	Calypso Red Pearl
018	F1	Retrofitted with High Downforce Kit and LM-spec engine.	Midnight Blue Pearl, later repainted Platinum Silver
019	-	Chassis used as F1 GTR chassis 01R.	-
020	F1	Sold to Tony Smith.	Mid Blue Pearl
021	F1		Blood Red Solid
022	F1	Sold to German banker Thomas Bscher. Later owned by Wyclef Jean.	Genesis Dark Blue, later repainted metallic green
023	F1		British Racing Green, later repainted silver
024	F1		Carbon
025	F1	Sold to George Harrison.	Dark Purple Pearl
026	-	Chassis used as F1 GTR chassis 02R.	-
027	-	Chassis used as F1 GTR chassis 03R.	-
028	F1	Given to Michael Andretti as part of his settlement for leaving the McLaren Formula 1 team. Later sold.	Gran Prix Red
029	F1	Sold at auction for $20,465,000 in 2021.	Creighton Brown
030	-	Chassis used as F1 GTR.	-
031	F1	Sold to Japanese customer Yoshikuni Okamoto.	Special White
032	-	Chassis used as F1 GTR.	-
033	F1	Crashed, was repaired and then destroyed in another crash.	Base Silver
034	-	Chassis used as F1 GTR.	-
035	-	Chassis used as F1 GTR.	-
036	F1	Sold to TAG CEO Mansour Ojjeh who held a significant stake in McLaren.	Pale Blue Metallic
037	F1		Special Silver
038	F1		Base Silver, later repainted Kandy Orange
039	F1	Suspected to be owned by a member of the Sinaloa Cartel.	Brazilian Brown Metallic
040	F1	Fitted with high mounted mirrors.	Magnesium Silver, later repainted Blu Alfa
041	-	Chassis used as F1 GTR.	-
042	F1	Imported into the US by Ameritech. Sold in 2021 for $16,550,000.	Base Silver, later repainted red
043	F1	Owned by Motokazu Sayama.	Black Metallic
044	F1	Imported into the US by Ameritech. Sold in 2017 for $15,620,000. Currently owned by Lewis Hamilton.	Base Silver
045	F1	Imported into the US by Ameritech.	Dark Silver
046	F1	Sold to Ray Bellm.	Genesis Blue Metallic
047	F1		Magnesium Silver
048	F1	Sold to a customer in Switzerland.	Brilliant Blue Metallic
049	F1		Mercedes Brilliant Silver
050	F1	Fitted with high mounted mirrors.	Painted Magnesium Silver
051	F1		Dark Metallic Green
052	F1		Dark Blue Mica
053	F1	Sold to a Japanese customer. Later imported to Europe.	Marlboro White
054	F1 GT	Owned by royal family of Brunei.	Black
055	F1	Imported into the US by Ameritech. Fitted with high mounted mirrors.	Magnesium Silver
056	F1 XP GT	Prototype F1 GT owned by McLaren.	Silverstone Green
057	F1		Magnesium Silver
058	F1 GT	Sold to Yoshio Tsuzuki.	Dark Burgundy
059	F1	Retrofitted with High Downforce Kit.	Magnesium Silver
060	F1		Dandelion Yellow
061	F1	Sold to Rowan Atkinson. Crashed twice and repaired. Sold in 2015 for $12,200,000.	Dark Burgundy
062	F1	Imported into the US by Ameritech and sold to Larry Ellison.	Magnesium Silver
063	F1		Magnesium Silver
064	F1		Magnesium Silver
065	F1		Magnesium Silver
066	F1		Magnesium Silver
067	F1	Imported into the US by Ameritech. Previously owned by Elon Musk.	Magnesium Silver
068	F1	Imported into the US.	Mercedes Brilliant Silver
069	F1	Retrofitted with High Downforce Kit which was later removed.	Mercedes Brilliant Silver, later repainted Carbon Black
070	F1		Mercedes Brilliant Silver
071	F1	Fitted with high mounted mirrors.	Historic Orange
072	F1		Jet Black, later repainted White
073	F1	Retrofitted with High Downforce Kit and LM spec engine.	AMG Green Velvet, later repainted Kandy Orange
074	F1	Imported into the US by Ameritech. Fitted with high mounted mirrors.	Magnesium Silver
075	F1	Last production F1. Sold to Aziz Ojjeh, brother of Mansour Ojjeh.	Yquem
XP LM	F1 LM	Prototype F1 LM. Owned by McLaren	Historic Orange
LM1	F1 LM	Owned by royal family of Brunei.	Black with yellow, blue and silver striping (as LM4)
LM2	F1 LM	Sold to Yoshio Tsuzuki.	Historic Orange
LM3	F1 LM	Owned by Ralph Lauren.	Historic Orange
LM4	F1 LM	Owned by royal family of Brunei.	Black with yellow, blue and silver striping (as LM1)
LM5	F1 LM	Owned by royal family of Brunei.	Historic Orange

== See also ==
- Production car speed record
- Timeline of most powerful production cars
- Gordon Murray Automotive T.50
- Gordon Murray Automotive S1
