= Gordon Murray =

South African and British automobile designer (born 1946)

Gordon Murray CBE
- Born: Ian Gordon Murray; 18 June 1946 (age 80); Durban, Union of South Africa
- Education: Glenwood High School
- Alma mater: Durban University of Technology
- Occupation: Executive chairman
- Employers: Gordon Murray Design (2005–present); McLaren Group (1987–2004); Brabham (1969–1986)
- Known for: Brabham Motor Racing; Team McLaren; McLaren F1
- Awards: FIA President Innovation Medal
- Website: gordonmurrayautomotive.com

Ian Gordon Murray (born 18 June 1946) is a South African and British former Formula One racing car designer, renowned firstly as lead designer for Brabham and technical director for McLaren Formula 1 racing teams, during 1969–1986 and 1987–1991 respectively, then as designer of high-end, high-performance sports cars and a variety of other innovative automotive projects.

After leaving McLaren, Murray founded the Gordon Murray Design consultancy and, in 2017, the low-volume specialist car manufacturing company Gordon Murray Automotive, both now incorporated into the Gordon Murray Group.

== Early life ==
The child of Scottish immigrant parents, Murray was born and grew up in Durban, South Africa. His father was a motorcycle racer and later prepared racing cars. Murray studied mechanical engineering at Natal Technical College, now Durban University of Technology.

A recreation of the 1967 IGM Ford T.1. built using original drawings

He built and raced his own car, the IGM Ford, in the South African National Class during 1967 and 1968.

== Formula One career ==
=== Brabham: 1969–1986 ===
Murray moved to England in 1969, hoping to find a job at Lotus Cars. But Murray was offered a job at Brabham after coincidentally meeting then Brabham designer Ron Tauranac. When Bernie Ecclestone took over the Brabham team, he appointed Murray Chief Designer. There, Murray designed many Grand Prix cars, some of which were World Championship Grand Prix winners. These designs include the BT46B, also known as "the Brabham fan car", as well as the World Championship winning BT49 and BT52. Murray developed a reputation for an innovative approach to design, applied not only to car concepts and details but also to race strategy.

Between 1973 and 1985, Murray's Brabhams scored 22 Grand Prix wins, finished 2nd in the Constructors' Championship in 1975 and 1981, and gave Nelson Piquet Drivers' Championships in 1981 and 1983. For the 1986 season, Murray designed the radical and highly ambitious low-line Brabham BT55, lowering overall ride height by inclining the engine and placing the driver in a recumbent position. However, the car was not a success, finishing only seven of the sixteen races in the season.

==== List of Brabham Formula One cars designed by Gordon Murray ====
- Brabham BT42 (1973–1974)
- Brabham BT44 (1974)
- Brabham BT44B (1975)
- Brabham BT45 (1976)
- Brabham BT45B (1977)
- Brabham BT45C (1978)
- Brabham BT46 (1978)
- Brabham BT46B (1978)
- Brabham BT46C (1978)
- Brabham BT48 (1979)
- Brabham BT49 (1979–1980)
- Brabham BT49B (1980)
- Brabham BT49C (1981–1982)
- Brabham BT50 (1981–1982)
- Brabham BT49D (1982)
- Brabham BT52 (1983)
- Brabham BT52B (1983)
- Brabham BT53 (1984)
- Brabham BT54 (1985–1986)
- Brabham BT55 (1986)

=== McLaren: 1987–1991 ===
In 1986, Murray received an offer from Ron Dennis to join McLaren as Technical Director, taking over the role formerly held by John Barnard. Murray brought his Brabham experience to the McLaren design team, led by Chief Designer Steve Nichols. The 1988 MP4/4 car, with a Honda turbo-powered engine, won 15 of the season's 16 Grands Prix, and gave Ayrton Senna his first Drivers' Championship. In the Constructors' Championship, McLaren's points score of 199 was at that time an all-time high. Murray also oversaw the design of the naturally-aspirated engined 1989 MP4/5 and 1990 MP4/5B with Chief Designer Neil Oatley. The MP4/5 and MP4/5B won the driver's and constructor's championships in both years. Over the period 1988–91, the McLaren team won four consecutive Constructors' and Drivers' Championships: Alain Prost won the Drivers' Championship in 1989, while Senna won further Drivers' Championships in 1990 and 1991.

== McLaren Cars ==
From 1991 to 2004, Murray headed the offshoot McLaren Cars team to design road-going supercars, starting with the McLaren F1 in 1992. In a lightly modified “LM” specification in 1995 it became the last road-legal sportscar to win the 24 Hours of Le Mans endurance race outright, across all classes, including race places 1, 3, 4 & 5.

== Business ventures ==
=== Gordon Murray Design ===
In July 2007, the Gordon Murray Design consultancy was established, and released initial details of its T.25 (Type 25) prototype city car along with mention of a future lightweight, economical supercar project. The T25 would be smaller than a Smart Fortwo. In 2008 Murray won the 'Idea of the Year' accolade at Autocar magazine's annual awards ceremony for the manufacturing process for the T.25.

In November 2009, Gordon Murray Design and Zytek Automotive announced plans to develop an electric-powered version of the T.25, the T.27. This car being a product of a partnership between Murray's company and British technology company Zytek, in charge of building the powertrain.

The T.25 won the 2010 Royal Automobile Club’s Future Car Challenge, with a 97 miles per gallon fuel consumption over the 60 mile course from Brighton to London. The next year the T.27 won the electric car class and best overall.

=== Gordon Murray Automotive ===
In 2017, Murray established the specialist car company Gordon Murray Automotive, for the design and hand-built manufacture of super cars based on his design principles for "driver-focused cars".

On 4 August 2020, Gordon Murray Automotive announced the T.50 sports car, the "logical successor" to the McLaren F1 and incorporating the "fan car" concept of the Brabham BT46B, which went into production in 2022.

On 27 January 2022, Gordon Murray Automotive announced the T.33 super car. A twin-seater, potentially 'day to day' sportscar with the same engine as the T.50, but built on a new platform to be used by three other future cars.

=== Gordon Murray Group ===
Murray later established the broader Gordon Murray Group, including Gordon Murray Automotive (GMA) and Gordon Murray Technologies (GMT). GMT serves as the group's dedicated engineering and technology division, with an expanded focus on electrification, lightweight structures, and future mobility platforms.

In July 2023, Abu Dhabi–based CYVN Holdings acquired a controlling stake in Gordon Murray Technologies. The investment was made to support GMT’s expansion and accelerate its development of electric and autonomous vehicle technologies.

In 2025, Gordon Murray Special Vehicles was added to the Group with the announcement of two new supercars, the GMSV Le Mans GTR and the GMSV S1 LM. The first S1 LM was sold at auction at the Las Vegas Grand Prix on 21 November 2025 for $20.63 million.

== Other projects ==
In 1981, Murray was involved in improvements for Midas Cars.

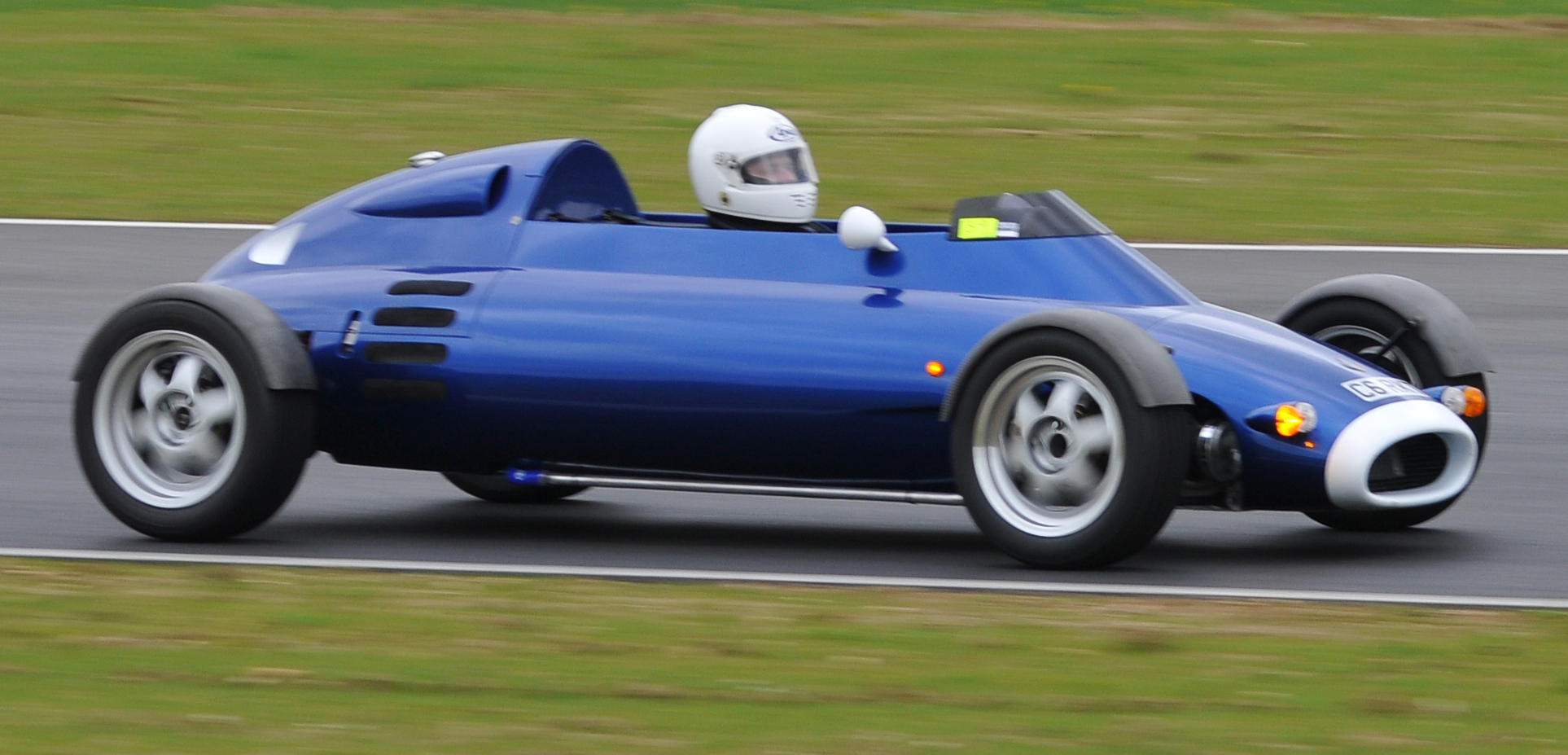
Light Car Company 'Rocket'

Murray independently designed the Rocket, an ultra-lightweight, open cockpit roadster powered by a 1-litre motorcycle engine, which has an appearance similar to that of a 60's era Grand Prix car. Looking like a single-seater, it could accommodate a passenger in tandem with the driver, the second seat located beneath a removable cover. The Rocket was built by former racing driver Chris Craft at the Light Car Company.

In September 2016, it was announced that Murray had been appointed to develop the OX truck, a flat pack low-cost vehicle, for the British charity Global Vehicle Trust (GVT). GVT founded OX Delivers to utilise the design to make last-mile transport more accessible and reliable in emerging markets. Murray created four experimental prototypes; XP1-XP4. XP2, XP3, and XP4 are owned by OX Delivers, with one of the vehicles having been converted to a fully-electric truck. OX then went on to build 2 more electric trucks adapting the original design for EV use. XP1 is owned by Murray for his private collection.

From 2015, Murray collaborated with TVR to design the upcoming TVR models, with the TVR Griffith prototype unveiled in 2017, though the car has yet to enter full production.

== Honours and awards ==
In the 2019 New Year Honours list Murray was awarded a CBE for services to motoring.

His alma mater, Durban University of Technology, made Gordon Murray an Honorary Professor in 2002 and awarded him an honorary doctorate in 2011.

In 2019, a celebration of 50 years of Murray's involvement in the car industry was held, called One Formula. Every one of Murray's F1 designs was on display along with the McLaren F1 roadcar and examples from his personal car collection, along with hundreds of rock band T-shirts that Murray had collected over the years. The two-volume hardcover book One Formula – 50 years of Car Design, limited to just 1,000 copies, details Murray's designs. In 2022, Murray was awarded the inaugural FIA President's Innovation Medal, 'for his constant innovative approach to race and road car design'.

In 2024, Murray was awarded the BBC Top Gear Lifetime Achievement Award as 'arguably the greatest and most original thinker in both Formula One and the wider automotive sphere'.
