= Ojjeh =

Ojjeh is a surname. It is a prominent family originally from Damascus, Syria. Descendants are present in Lebanon, Jordan, Saudi Arabia, the United Kingdom, France, Switzerland, the USA etc.

Notable people with the surname include:

- Akram Ojjeh (1923–1991), Syrian-born Saudi businessman
- Karim Ojjeh (born 1965), Saudi businessman and racing driver
- Mansour Ojjeh (1952–2021), French Saudi Arabia-born entrepreneur
