= McLaren Group =

British automotive holding company

McLaren Group Limited
- Type: Private
- Industry: Automotive
- Founded: 2 December 1985; 40 years ago
- Headquarters: McLaren Technology Centre, Woking, England, United Kingdom 51°20′45.0″N 0°32′54.0″W
- Key people: Paul Walsh (executive chairman)
- Products: Sports cars
- Revenue: ▲£815.5 million (2024)
- Operating income: ▲ −£111.9 million (2024)
- Net income: ▲ −£257.5 million (2024)
- Owner: Mumtalakat Holding Company (60%); CYVN Holdings (40%)
- Number of employees: ▲2,627 (2024)
- Subsidiaries: McLaren Racing
- Website: www.mclaren.com

McLaren Group Limited (/məˈklærən/ mə-KLARR-ən) is a British holding company based in Woking, England, which is involved in Formula One and other motorsport, the manufacture of sports cars and golf equipment.

The group was founded by Ron Dennis shortly after his acquisition of the McLaren Formula One team in 1981, as the TAG McLaren Group due to a partnership with Mansour Ojjeh's TAG Group. The Formula One team had been established by New Zealander Bruce McLaren in 1963.

McLaren Group was renamed McLaren Technology Group in 2015. In June 2017 it was announced that Dennis had sold his 25% shareholding in the company to the other shareholders, in addition to his shares in McLaren Automotive. The group then merged with McLaren Automotive to form a new company using the previous McLaren Group name.

== History ==
Bruce McLaren started Bruce McLaren Motor Racing in 1963 and the team first entered Formula One in 1966. Teddy Mayer took over direction of the group following McLaren's death while testing a Can-am series car in 1970. Mayer subsequently led McLaren to their first World Constructors' Championship in 1974 with Brazilian driver Emerson Fittipaldi, who also won the World Drivers' Championship that year.

Between 1998 and 2011, McLaren built both the McLaren Technology Centre, a new headquarters and factory for the Group, and the McLaren Production Centre, in Woking, England.

In late May 2020, McLaren Group announced the layoff of 25% of its workforce as part of a company restructure due to the COVID-19 pandemic. The group announced in December 2020 that American investment firm MSP Sports Capital had purchased 15% of McLaren Racing, as part of a deal that would see them grow their stake to 33% by the end of 2022. The £185 million investment valued the team at £560 million. In April 2021, Global Net Lease announced that it had agreed to acquire the McLaren Technology Centre in Woking for £170 million. The group sold McLaren Applied to Greybull Capital in August 2021.

In March 2024, Mumtalakat Holding Company, the sovereign wealth fund of the Kingdom of Bahrain acquired all outstanding shares of McLaren Group and took full control of the company. In December 2024, Mumtalakat Holding Company sold 100% of McLaren Automotive to Abu Dhabi-based investment firm CYVN Holdings. The sale also included a non-controlling stake in the McLaren Group.

== Subsidiaries ==
=== McLaren Racing ===
McLaren originally entered Formula One in 1966 under its founder Bruce McLaren. However, in 1970 he died in a crash. The team was saved by Teddy Mayer, who helped the team win their first Constructors and Drivers titles. After Mayer, Ron Dennis took over the McLaren Racing team and worked for the company until 2018. However, at the beginning of the 2009 season, Dennis handed over the F1 department to Martin Whitmarsh so Dennis could focus on expanding McLaren overall, and especially in the road car market.

In 1966, McLaren suffered with reliability with their Ford 4.2-litre engine, and only scored one point after changing to a Serenissima V8. In 1967 they tried two different BRM engines. For the 1968 season they switched to Cosworth Ford engines. These continued to 1983, apart from a couple of Alfa Romeo examples, and then the TAG-Porsche turbo came in. This was the start of the MP4 cars, and the first entire carbon-composite chassis.

Honda engines took over in 1988, and then in 1993 the MP4/8 had a Ford HB engine. The next year was a Peugeot V10, and then the Mercedes era began in 1995, ending after the 2014 season.

The team's first F1 race win occurred in 1968 when Bruce McLaren won the non-championship Race of Champions at Brands Hatch driving a McLaren M7A Ford. Later that year the team scored its first Grand Prix win when Bruce McLaren took the Belgian Grand Prix at Spa Francorchamps. By the end of the season Denny Hulme had won two further Grands Prix—in Italy and Canada (the team's first 1-2 finish in a World Championship race). Emerson Fittipaldi won the F1 world championship in 1974, and McLaren also took their first constructor's title at the same time. The 1976 title was taken by James Hunt, and then there was a gap until 1984. Then, Lauda took the title, and Prost took it the next two years running. The team took the constructor's title in 1984 and 1985.

In 1988, the McLaren MP4/4 had a very successful year. Not only did Senna win the title, but the car won 15 out of 16 races, and, apart from just 27 laps, led every single lap during the year. Prost won in 1989, and then left for Ferrari after clashing with Senna. Senna also won the title for McLaren in 1990 and 1991.

The partnership between McLaren and Mercedes began in 1995 with McLaren choosing to use Mercedes engines. McLaren and Mercedes announced their intention to part ways in November 2009 as Mercedes had bought the debut-season driver and constructor winning team Brawn. It was re-branded as Mercedes Grand Prix. Ron Dennis said one reason McLaren and Mercedes parted ways was because of his "ambitious plans to turn McLaren into a car manufacturer." Dennis insisted that in the 21st century "to survive in F1 you need to have more than just a team". However Mercedes continued to supply engines to McLaren until 2014.

Vodafone's title sponsorship deal, which began in 2007, ended at the finish of the 2013 season. In 2014, the team's official title was McLaren Mercedes. In 2015, the team, under a new partnership with car manufacturer Honda changed its official title to McLaren Honda. In 2018, the team was powered by customer Renault power units until 2020, when the team switched from Renault back to Mercedes. McLaren's most-recent titles were secured in 2025, with Lando Norris winning his first Drivers' Championship and McLaren its second consecutive Constructors' Championship.

== Former subsidiaries ==
Former subsidiaries of McLaren Group are:

Name	Description	Current status	Details
Team Bahrain McLaren	A UCI World Tour cycling team operated as a joint venture with the Kingdom of Bahrain.	Active	McLaren joined the partnership for the 2020 Team Bahrain McLaren season, however later withdrew from the partnership at the end of the season due to the COVID-19 pandemic. and the team still runs as Team Bahrain Victorious
McLaren Automotive	Sports car Manufacturer	Active	Founded in 1985 as McLaren Cars and released the McLaren F1 in 1992. Between 1994 and 2010, McLaren Cars was registered as a 'dormant company', before the founding of McLaren Automotive in 2010. McLaren Automotive replaced McLaren Cars in 2010. The new company was originally separate from the existing McLaren companies to enable investment in the new venture, but was brought together in July 2017 after Ron Dennis sold his shares in McLaren Automotive and McLaren Group. McLaren Group sold McLaren Automotive to CYVN Holdings in 2024.
McLaren Applied	Technology company working in different performance areas	Active	Founded in 1991 as McLaren Composites. Changed its name when it merged with TAG Electronics. The company was best known for building the McLaren F1 and Mercedes SLR structures and supplying major parts for Beagle 2. In 2021, McLaren Group sold the company to Greybull Capital. In 2025, the company was rebranded as Motion Applied.
TAG Electronic Systems	Electronics Company	Closed	Merged with McLaren Composites to become McLaren Applied
McLaren Advanced Vehicles	Founded to focus on breaking the land speed record.	Closed	Abandoned after the success of the Thrust SSC.
McLaren Electronic Systems	Developed and manufactured automotive control systems and components for motorsports	Reorganised as a division of McLaren Applied Technologies	Became a brand of McLaren Applied Technologies
TAG McLaren Audio	Electronics Manufacturer	Active	Manufactured hi-fi, CD player, DVD player, and other electronics. Sold to International Audio Group and renamed Audiolab
Lydden Circuit	A racetrack near Dover in Kent	Active	Purchased the track in 1991. In 2008, British Rallycross Champion and FIA European Rallycross Championship runner-up Pat Doran obtained the lease for the circuit from McLaren and later became the owner.
McLaren Animation	A CGI animation studio originally created to develop Tooned.	Reorganised as a division of McLaren Marketing	Launched in 2012. Was later merged with McLaren's other television-related businesses into McLaren Marketing.

== Ownership ==
Ron Dennis initially owned all of McLaren after buying out the remaining original shareholders after Bruce McLaren's death. In 1983 he offered Mansour Ojjeh the chance to purchase 50% of the team, with McLaren becoming a joint venture with Ojjeh's TAG Group. In 2000, after supplying engines to the team through its Mercedes subsidiary for five years, Daimler AG exercised an option to buy 40% of the TAG McLaren Group. Dennis and Ojjeh each retained a 30% share.

In August 2006 it was reported that Daimler was considering acquiring the remaining 60% of the McLaren Group. However, it was announced in January 2007 that the Mumtalakat Holding Company had purchased 15% each from both Dennis and Ojjeh. In November 2009, Mercedes bought Brawn GP (renaming it Mercedes GP) and announced that McLaren would buy back Daimler's 40% share of the group over a period of two years. The shares were divided evenly between the remaining shareholders, with the Mumtalakat Holding Company owning 50% and Dennis and Ojjeh each owning 25%.

Dennis had stepped down as CEO of McLaren in 2009, handing over the reins to Martin Whitmarsh, but returned to his post in 2014 under the condition that he would seek investment to take a controlling interest in the company. His attempts to do so ultimately failed, and in November 2016 he lost a court case against his fellow shareholders that saw him suspended from his position as chairman. Dennis' contract with McLaren expired in January 2017, and in June 2017 it was announced that he had agreed to sell his remaining shares in both the McLaren Technology Group and McLaren Automotive. McLaren Automotive then became a subsidiary of the McLaren Technology Group, merging the shareholding of the two companies and seeing the group revert to its original McLaren Group name.

In May 2018, it was announced that Canadian businessman Michael Latifi had purchased approximately 10% of the group with an investment of £200 million. This left the shareholding at: Mumtalakat Holding Company 56.4%, TAG Group Limited 14.32%, Nidala (BVI) Limited (Michael Latifi) 9.84%, Favorita Limited 5.78%, Perlman Investments Limited 5.77%, McKal Holdings Ltd 5.24%, Acanitt Limited 2.65%. In 2024, Mumtalakat, owned by the government of Bahrain, bought 100% of the company. On 10 December 2024, it was reported that CYVN Holdings, an investment entity wholly owned by the Government of Abu Dhabi, acquired McLaren Automotive from Mumtalakat. The deal had CYVN obtain a non-controlling stake in McLaren Racing which remains under the control of Mumtalakat.
