= Mansour Ojjeh =

French Saudi Arabian-born entrepreneur (1952–2021)

- Born: Mansour Akram Ojjeh; 25 September 1952; Saudi Arabia
- Died: 6 June 2021 (aged 68); Geneva, Switzerland

Mansour Akram Ojjeh (25 September 1952 – 6 June 2021) (Arabic: مَنْصُور أَكْرَم عُجَّة, romanized: Manṣūr ʾAkram ʿUjjah) was a French Saudi Arabian-born billionaire entrepreneur who owned a part of TAG, a Luxembourg-based holding company with interests worldwide. Ojjeh was the CEO of TAG, which owned 14.32% of the McLaren Group, whose assets include McLaren Automotive and the McLaren Formula One team since the 1970s and 2000s.

Ojjeh was at one time the owner of TAG Heuer and Farnborough Airport. He also owned 10% of the upmarket jewellers Asprey and Garrard.

== Early life and education ==
Ojjeh was born in 1952 and was the son of the Saudi naturalized Syrian businessman Akram Ojjeh, and the owner of Techniques d'Avant Garde based in Luxembourg, an investment company that was focused mainly in advanced technologies. His father was an intermediary in deals between Saudi Arabia and France, particularly arms sales. His mother was French and he spent much of his childhood in France. He attended American School in Paris, and graduated in 1974 with a degree in Business Administration from Menlo College in California. Ojjeh gained his master's degree later at Santa Clara University. He had four siblings.

== Career ==
=== TAG Group ===
After graduating from college, Ojjeh was named CEO of the company founded by his father, TAG Group, which largely operates in Europe and the Middle East. The company originally invested in numerous sectors such as motor racing, aviation and watchmaking. The firm became famous for brokering deals between France and Saudi Arabia, especially with regards to defense systems and weapons. In 1985, Ojjeh bought Heuer, a watchmaker based in Switzerland, which marks the beginning of TAG Heuer watch brand. Ojjeh's company, TAG Gruppe, was the largest single shareholder of TAG Heuer. LVMH Moёt Hennessy Louis Vuitton bought the brand in 1999 for $740 million. During the early days of his tenure as the CEO of TAG Group, Ojjeh has tried to avoid publicity as much as he could but hit the headlines when he purchased the liner France. He assumed the presidency of the company after the death of his father, Akram Ojjeh, in 1991.

=== Motorsport investments ===
==== Williams ====
Ojjeh's interest with motorsport began when he watched the 1978 Monaco Grand Prix as a guest of the Saudi Arabian royal family, which owned flag-carrier Saudia, a sponsor of Williams Racing. Ojjeh's company at the time had brokered numerous deals between France and his native Saudi Arabia. The race turned Ojjeh into a big racing fanatic and convinced him to expand his business further in motorsport investment starting from the sponsorship to funding the racing engine development for the F1 team later at some point.

At the first attempt to enter motorsport, Ojjeh brokered a sponsorship deal between his company TAG Group and Williams. In 1979, TAG Group successfully secured the position as principal sponsor for Williams. He became the company's familiar representative in the paddock, along with his younger brother Aziz. With the influx of capital invested by Ojjeh's TAG Group, Williams team Engineering Director at the time Patrick Head was able to design a competitive car, the Williams FW07. The car was successful and the team secured victory in 1979 British Grand Prix with Swiss driver Clay Regazzoni. Under Ojjeh's sponsorship, Williams produced two champions, Australian driver Alan Jones who was the first driver to win the World Driver Championship title for Williams in 1980, and Finnish driver Keke Rosberg who won in 1982.

==== McLaren ====
In 1981, Ojjeh met British businessman Ron Dennis, who was the CEO of McLaren Group which owned the McLaren racing team. Dennis persuaded Ojjeh to become his partner to manage McLaren racing team. Ojjeh agreed terms with Dennis and became the majority stakeholder for McLaren Group, owning a 60 percent stake in the company. During the 1980s, Ojjeh invested in Porsche-built turbocharged engines which carried the name of his company, Techniques d'Avant Garde (TAG). During Ojjeh's early career in McLaren, he and Ron Dennis brought back the then-retired Formula One champion Niki Lauda to the grid as a McLaren driver in 1982. It was unveiled at the Geneva Motor Show in early 1983 and raced for the first time at the 1983 Dutch Grand Prix in August 1983. In 1984, the McLaren-Tag Porsche dominated F1, the team winning 12 of 16 races and Lauda beating team-mate Prost to the title by the smallest margin in the sport’s history, half a point. McLaren dominated the sport in that era. In 1984 season, Lauda won his third championship with his team-mate Alain Prost scoring half points behind him and team won the constructors' championship two years streak. Prost would later claim his first championship title the next year 1985 season and won his second during the 1986 season despite the team only finishing 2nd in constructors' championship. The TAG engine usage came to an end in 1987 due to the powertrain losing its competitive values and McLaren signing a deal with Honda as its new engine suppliers.

Ojjeh's involvement at McLaren continued past the end of the use of TAG-badged powertrains. The team would later sign Brazilian driver Ayrton Senna for three years, on recommendation from Honda. McLaren would continue its domination with Honda engines from 1988 onwards. The team would secure the constructors' championship 4 times, with Senna winning the drivers' championship three times and Prost once during the Honda era. The McLaren-Honda engine deal came to an end in 1993 as Japan faced a domestic economic crisis and as the ban on turbocharged engines in the sport removed their competitive edge. McLaren would move on to sign with Ford, Peugeot, and finally Mercedes.

During the Mercedes era, the team would secure the constructors' championship once and the drivers' championship three times with Finnish driver Mika Häkkinen winning the 1998 and 1999 world championships and Lewis Hamilton the 2008 championship. In 2000, after supplying engines to the team through its Mercedes subsidiary for 5 years, Daimler AG exercised an option to buy 40% of the TAG McLaren Group. Dennis and Ojjeh each retained a 30% share, and each sold half of their stake to the Mumtalakat Holding Company (the sovereign wealth fund of the Kingdom of Bahrain) in 2007. Although Daimler were reportedly considering acquiring the remaining 60% from Dennis and Ojjeh, they instead bought Brawn GP (renaming it Mercedes GP) in November 2009; their McLaren shares were sold back to Mumtalakat, Dennis, and Ojjeh in 2010.

As the team performance deteriorated, Ojjeh's relationship with Dennis was heavily affected. Both have faced numerous disagreement between each other since. During these times McLaren was criticized due to underperforming after resuming the powertrain supply deal with Honda which affected the car performance. In 2014, while Ojjeh was hospitalized for lung disease, Dennis removed CEO Martin Whitmarsh who was a close friend of Ojjeh and terminated the team contract with Mexican driver Sergio Pérez in order to give way to Danish driver Kevin Magnussen; both in opposition to Ojjeh's wishes. In 2015 Dennis wanted to keep Kevin Magnussen to partner Fernando Alonso in 2015, it was Ojjeh who stepped in and undermined him, forcing him to take Jenson Button instead. In 2016, Ron Dennis stepped down from McLaren. Later, Dennis unsuccessfully sued Ojjeh and Mumtalakat.

== Health issues and death ==
In late 2013, Ojjeh had a double lung transplant after suffering from IPF lung disease for the previous four years, returning to full health in 2014.

Ojjeh died on the morning of 6 June 2021 at the age of 68. McLaren Racing paid tribute to him with his name written in McLaren's logo style on the McLaren MCL35M and team cap at the 2021 French Grand Prix.

== Personal life ==
Ojjeh is survived by his wife Kathy, and their four children, Lana, Lia, Sara and Sultan.
