= McLaren Technology Centre =

Headquarters of the McLaren Group

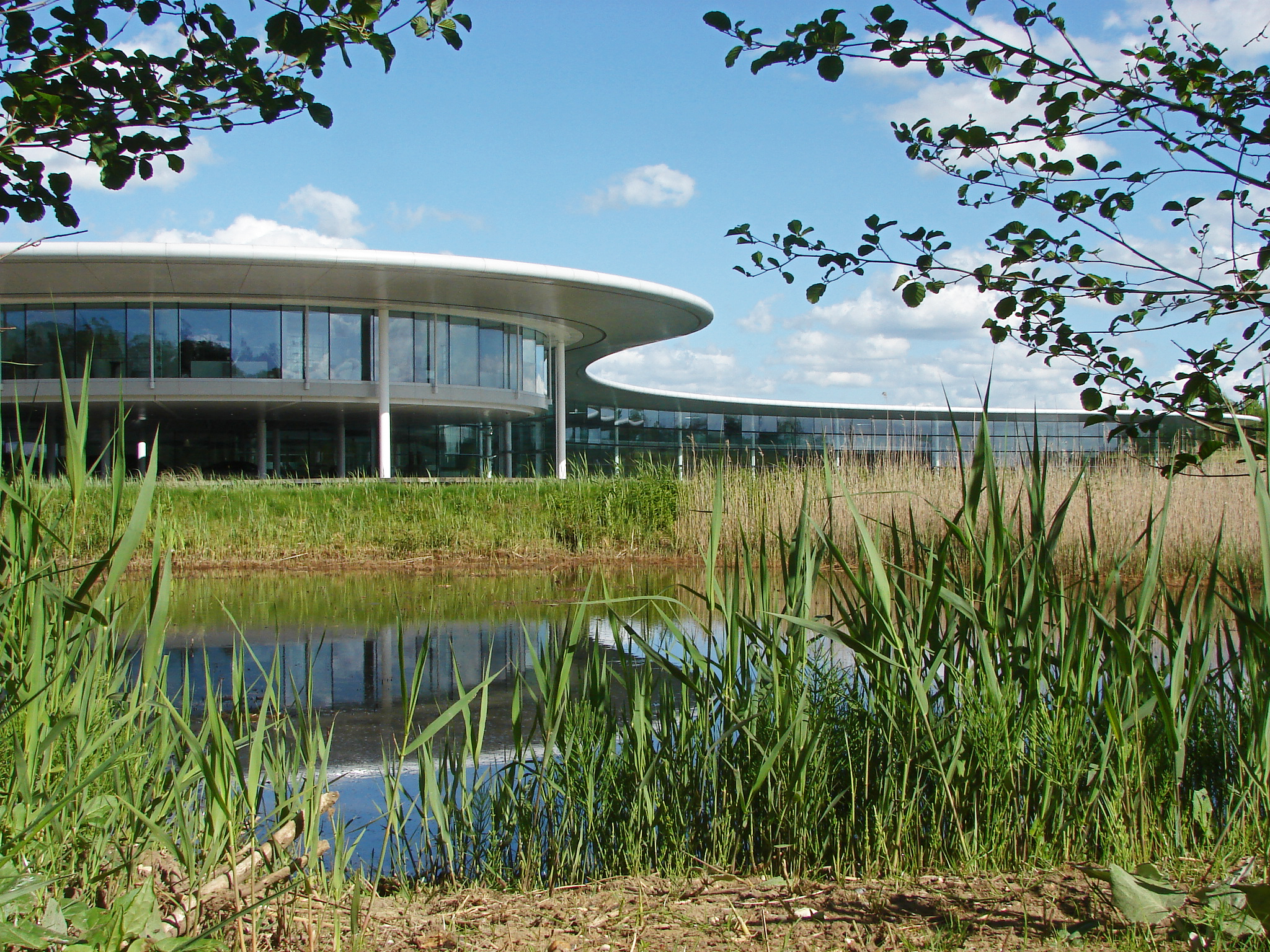

- Location within Surrey

General information
- Architectural style: Modern
- Location: Woking, England
- Coordinates: 51°20′45.0″N 0°32′54.0″W
- Current tenants: McLaren Group
- Construction started: 1998 (McLaren Technology Centre); 2010 (McLaren Production Centre)
- Completed: 2003 (McLaren Technology Centre); 2011 (McLaren Production Centre)
- Inaugurated: 12 May 2004
- Cost: £300 million (est.)
- Owner: McLaren Group

Technical details
- Floor count: 1 to 5

Design and construction
- Architect: Norman Foster
- Awards: 2005 Stirling Prize (Shortlisted)

The McLaren Technology Centre (MTC) is the headquarters of the McLaren Group and its subsidiaries, located on a 500,000 m^{2} (50 ha) site in Woking, Surrey, England. The complex consists of two buildings: the original McLaren Technology Centre, which acts as the main headquarters for the group, and the newer McLaren Production Centre, primarily used for manufacturing McLaren Automotive cars.

The main building is a large, roughly semi-circular, glass-walled building, designed by architect Norman Foster and his company, Foster + Partners. The building was short-listed for the 2005 Stirling Prize, which was won by the Scottish Parliament building. By 2015, approximately 1,500 people worked at the Technology Centre. The Technology Centre also serves as the home to McLaren Racing, McLaren Automotive, and other companies of the McLaren Group. It was also the main setting of McLaren's cartoon, Tooned.

In 2011, the size of the centre was doubled after a second building, the 34,500 m^{2} (371,000 sq ft) McLaren Production Centre, was built. McLaren is also planning an extension to this building to be used as an applied technology centre, as well as to house a new wind tunnel and simulator for McLaren Racing. The wind tunnel became operational by October 2023.

== Features ==
The building is accompanied by a series of artificial lakes: one formal lake directly opposite that completes the circle of the building, and a further four 'ecology' lakes. Together they contain about 50,000 m³ of water. This water is pumped through a series of heat exchangers to cool the building and to dissipate the heat produced by the wind tunnels. The main working space of the building is split into 18 metre wide sections known as 'fingers' that are separated by six-metre-wide (20 ft) corridors known as 'streets'. Facilities for employees include a 700-seat restaurant, a juice and coffee bar, a swimming pool and a fitness centre. An underground Visitor and Learning Centre is connected to the main building by a walkway.

A 145-metre-long (476 ft), rectangular-circuit shaped wind tunnel is located at one end of the building. Team McLaren uses it for testing and development of aerodynamic parts, as well as testing aerodynamic set-ups. The tunnel contains 400 tonnes of steel and the air is propelled by a four-metre-wide (13 ft) fan that rotates at up to 600 rpm.

The Technology Centre consolidated all aspects of the McLaren Group at one site, instead of the 18 separate sites previously occupied.

In 2024, the Optimum Nutrition McLaren Performance Hub, a "state-of-the-art health and fitness centre," was launched at the Technology Centre.

== History ==
McLaren's original application to build a new headquarters was made in 1995 and was unopposed by Woking Borough Council, however the development of such a large industrial site in green belt land led the Department of the Environment to order a public inquiry. The Environment Secretary, John Gummer, gave the development his approval in March 1997 under rules which allow development in the green belt "in very special circumstances"; Gummer said the McLaren application was such a case due to the economic and business arguments of the proposals and that he took the view that "[McLaren] is exceptional, both in the quality of its products and its achievements."

Work on the project, originally known as the Paragon Technology Centre, started in 1998 and about 4,000 construction workers were involved in what the Financial Times said "[was] claimed to be the biggest privately funded construction project in Europe." In February 2000, DaimlerChrysler purchased 40 percent of the McLaren Group and McLaren subsequently announced it would build the Mercedes-Benz SLR McLaren at the new facility.

Ron Dennis explained one of his rationales for the project in 2000: "Put a man in a dark room, he's hot, it smells bad, versus a guy in a cool room, well-lit, smells nice... When you throw a decision at those two individuals, who's going to be better equipped to effect good judgment and make a good decision?"

McLaren employees started using the facility in May 2003. McLaren has not disclosed the project's cost, but BBC News suggested a figure of £300m.

=== McLaren Production Centre ===
A second facility, the McLaren Production Centre, was built beside the McLaren Technology Centre in 2011 and serves as the production site of McLaren Automotive's road cars, including the McLaren 720S and McLaren Senna.

=== Extension ===
Planning permission for an extension to the McLaren Production Centre was granted in 2016. This "applied technology centre" will include "an aerodynamic research facility, workshops, research and development space, offices, meeting rooms, teaching and training space, vehicle preparation and assembly spaces, together with terraced car parking and two car park decks, cycle parking, a replacement helipad, and service areas."

=== Sale ===
On 20 April 2021 New York Stock Exchange-listed REIT, Global Net Lease (NYSE: GNL), announced that they had agreed to acquire the McLaren Group Headquarters in a sale-leaseback transaction for £170 million. The transaction was expected to close in the second quarter of 2021 and included a 20-year, NNN lease with no landlord obligations. The McLaren Group is said to have pursued the sale-and-leaseback deal to help deliver a financial boost, as it allows it to capitalize the expansive facility in Woking and then reinvest that money into the core operations of the company. In December 2025 Global Net Lease entered into an agreement to sell the McLaren Campus for £250 Million. In a 2026 interview with The Race Business, Zak Brown confirmed that McLaren has since purchased the McLaren Technology Centre back from Global Net Lease.

== In popular culture ==
The McLaren Technology Centre was the filming location for a Coruscant spaceport, and the OKX Thought Leadership Centre was used as the ISB's operations room in the television series Andor. The visual effects team increased the building's height and designed a moat along the edge of the building.

It was also used as the headquarters of the fictional F1 team APXGP in the F1 movie.

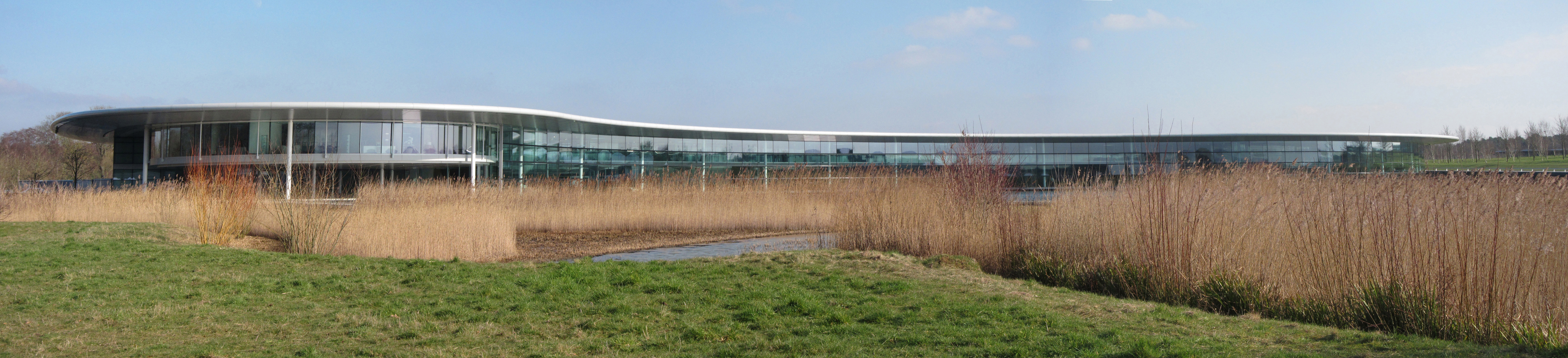
Panoramic view

== Bibliography ==
- Cropley, S (14. December, 2004). DreamWorks. Autocar (pp. 56–59).
