= Mumtalakat Holding Company =

Sovereign wealth fund of the Kingdom of Bahrain

Mumtalakat Holding Company B.S.C.
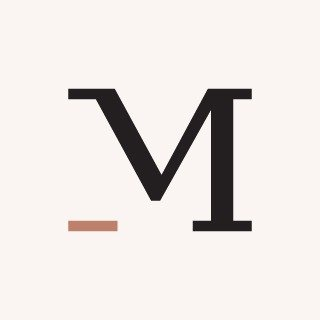
- Native name: شركة ممتلكات البحرين القابضة ش.م.ب مقفلة
- Type: State-owned
- Industry: Sovereign Wealth Fund Holding company
- Founded: June 29, 2006; 20 years ago in Bahrain
- Founder: Hamad bin Isa Al Khalifa
- Headquarters: Manama, Bahrain
- Area served: Worldwide
- Key people: Shaikh Salman bin Khalifa Al Khalifa (Board chairman); Shaikh Abdulla bin Khalifa Al Khalifa (CEO)
- Services: Investment
- Owner: Kingdom of Bahrain
- Subsidiaries: Aleastur Group; Aluminium Bahrain; Bahrain Real Estate Investment Company; Batelco (36.67%); Envirogen Group; FAI Aviation Group; Gulf Air; Gulf Cryo; McLaren Racing; National Bank of Bahrain (49%); Premo Group
- Website: mumtalakat.bh

Bahrain Mumtalakat Holding Company B.S.C. (Mumtalakat) is the sovereign wealth fund of the Kingdom of Bahrain. It was established by Royal Decree in 2006 and is wholly owned by the Government. Mumtalakat actively sought investment opportunities locally, regionally and internationally.

In December 2024, according to the Sovereign Wealth Fund Institute, the fund has nearly $17.6 billion in assets under management.

Mumtalakat invests in assets unrelated to either oil or gas across different sectors including education, aviation, healthcare, consumer and financial services, industrial manufacturing, real estate, tourism and logistics. From its inception in 2006, Mumtalakat initially pursued investments primarily in Bahrain, with just 3% apportioned abroad; in 2019, that figure rose to 30%, comprising investments in Europe, the United States, the Middle East and North Africa consisting of both minority and majority stakes in its portfolio companies. Mumtalakat Holding Company B.S.C. is based in the Arcapita Building, Bahrain Bay, Bahrain.

== Investments ==
Mumtalakat is a shareholder in:

- Aleastur Group
- Aluminium Bahrain
- Bahrain Real Estate Investment Company
- Bahrain Telecommunications Company (36.7%)
- Envirogen Group (British group specialising in industrial water treatment solutions)
- FAI Aviation Group (German private jet rental company)
- Gulf Air
- Gulf Cryo (first Kuwaiti gas manufacturer in industrial gases such as oxygen and nitrogen to the petroleum industry)
- Gulf Hotel Group (Bahraini hotels chain)
- National Bank of Bahrain
- Premo Group (German group specialized in the development, manufacture and sale of electronic components)

== McLaren Automotive divestment ==
On 10 December 2024, it was reported that CYVN Holdings acquired McLaren Automotive from Mumtalakat. The deal had CYVN obtain a non-controlling stake in McLaren Racing which remains under the control of Mumtalakat.
