= Akram Ojjeh =

Syrian-Saudi businessman (1918–1991)

- Born: Akram Ojjeh; 21 April 1918; Damascus, Occupied Enemy Territory Administration
- Died: 28 October 1991 (aged 73); France
- Occupation: Businessman
- Spouse(s): Irene, Renate & Nahed
- Children: Nadia; Salma; Laila; Mansour; Aziz; Karim; Sultan; Akram Jr

Akram Ojjeh (Arabic: أَكْرَم عُجَّة, romanized: ʾAkram ʿUjjah; 21 April 1918 – 28 October 1991) was a Syrian businessman. Ojjeh was an intermediary in deals between Saudi Arabia and France, particularly arms sales. Ojjeh founded Techniques d'Avant Garde, an investment company focused on advanced technologies.

== Techniques d'Avant Garde, (TAG) ==
Ojjeh founded Techniques d'Avant Garde, an investment company focused on advanced technologies.

TAG Group (Holdings) S.A. generates revenue through its various subsidiaries that offer products and services in the business aviation, motorsports, hospitality, consumer products and real estate industries.

TAG was formed in 1977 and was led by Akram's son Mansour until his death in 2021.

In 1985, TAG Group (Holdings) S.A. purchased Swiss watchmaker Heuer. TAG Group combined the TAG and Heuer brands to create the TAG Heuer brand and also gave its newly acquired watchmaking subsidiary the combined TAG Heuer name. Under TAG Group's ownership, TAG Heuer modernised its product line and significantly increased worldwide sales. LVMH purchased the TAG Heuer subsidiary in 1999 for US$740 million.

TAG Group is now primarily a holding company for Ojjeh shareholdings in TAG Aviation and MTG.

== Al-Yamamah arms deal ==
Ojjeh was involved in the marketing of the French Mirage 2000 fighter jet to Saudi Arabia in competition with the British Tornado. Adnan Khashoggi said in 1994 that Ojjeh was persuaded by the British sales team to "drop his role as 'fixer' for the French." British Aerospace went on to win what became the Al-Yamamah arms deal.

== SS France liner ==
Akram Ojjeh purchased the ocean liner SS France in October 24, 1977, for 80 million francs. On June 25, 1979, he sold her to Knut Kloster, the owner of Norwegian Caribbean Line, for 77 million francs.

== Personal life ==
Ojjeh is of Damascene origin.

He married four times. He was first married to a French woman with whom he had five children, including Mansour and Aziz. He later married Nahed Tlass (born 1958), who is the daughter of former Syrian Defense Minister Mustafa Tlass.

== Awards ==
In the 1970s, the French awarded Ojjeh with one of their highest state orders, Commander of the Legion of Honor.

== See also ==
Place des États-Unis
