= Martin Whitmarsh =

British businessman (born 1958)

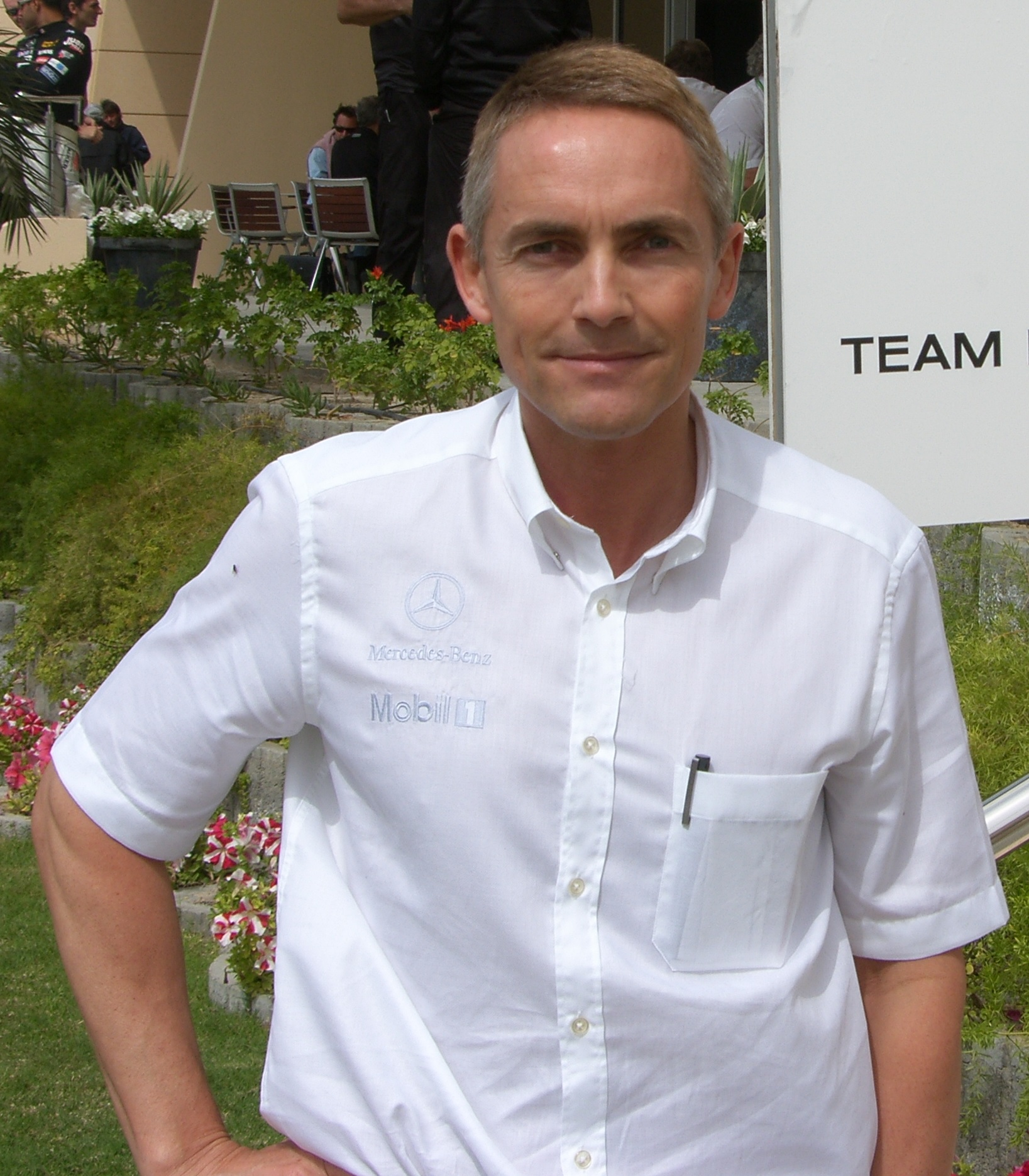
- Whitmarsh in 2006
- Born: Martin Richard Whitmarsh; 29 April 1958 (age 68)
- Occupations: Global Advisory Board member of the Formula E; Chairman of BAR Technologies Limited; Chair of Offshore Wind Growth Partnership Limited

Martin Richard Whitmarsh (born 29 April 1958) is a British businessman and former Group CEO of the Aston Martin Formula One Team. Whitmarsh is best known to motorsport insiders, media, and fans for his long and successful period at McLaren, for which he worked for 25 years (1989–2014) in various senior positions, including group chief executive officer, as well as Formula One Team Principal for six years (2008–2014).

Under his leadership, McLaren diversified its business activities beyond its core activity of Formula One, launching McLaren Automotive and McLaren Applied Technologies. Whitmarsh played a senior and leading role in the winning of more than 100 Formula One Grands Prix and multiple Formula One World Championships, and was at the centre of the development of several Formula One World Champions, including Lewis Hamilton. Whitmarsh was also chairman of the Formula One Teams Association for three years (2010–2012).

== Motorsport ==
=== McLaren ===
Whitmarsh joined McLaren in 1989 as an operations director, having come from British Aerospace (BAE). In 1997, Whitmarsh was promoted to the position of managing director and in April 2004, he was again promoted, this time to the position of chief operating officer of McLaren Group and chief executive officer of McLaren Racing.

On 1 March 2009, Ron Dennis stepped down as head of McLaren Racing to take a role in McLaren Automotive and Whitmarsh became team principal as a result, and a year later he was appointed to two new roles: chief executive officer of McLaren Group and deputy chairman of McLaren Automotive. Whitmarsh left his position as CEO of McLaren Racing and McLaren Group in January 2014 and replaced by his predecessor Ron Dennis in January 2014. He formally parted ways with McLaren in August 2014 after 25 years with the organisation.

=== Formula One Teams Association ===
In January 2009, Whitmarsh was elevated to president of the Formula One Teams Association (FOTA), replacing Ferrari chairman and FOTA founder Luca Cordero di Montezemolo. Whitmarsh maintained this position for four years until he stated that he would not stand for re-election in 2013

=== Formula E ===
In 2017, Whitmarsh joined the Global Advisory Board member of the Formula E. A series statement said the board's purpose would be "to steer the future direction of Formula E as a key player in influencing the global uptake of electric vehicles and its impact on reducing emissions."

=== Aston Martin ===
In October 2021, Whitmarsh was appointed as Group CEO of the newly created Aston Martin Performance Technologies where he was responsible for combining Aston Martin's Formula One activities with developing, applying and taking to market the group's technical capabilities, as well as intellectual property.

He subsequently left the role in October 2024, being replaced by former Managing Director of the Mercedes-AMG High Performance Powertrains Andy Cowell, who replaced Whitmarsh as Group CEO.

== Other roles ==
=== Land Rover BAR ===
In 2015, Whitmarsh became chief executive officer of Ben Ainslie Racing, subsequently Land Rover BAR, the British America's Cup team. During Whitmarsh's tenure, the business competed in the 35th America's Cup but was eliminated in the semi-final by Emirates Team New Zealand who ultimately won the World Series.

In 2017, Whitmarsh stepped aside as CEO of Land Rover Bar to be replaced by Grant Simmer, the four times America's Cup winner, on the understanding that the team would need someone with a full time focus on the racing team. Whitmarsh continues as an advisor to the team.

=== BAR Technologies Limited ===
Whitmarsh is the chairman and co-founder of BAR Technologies, a technology start-up business focussed on the marine sector and bringing innovative solutions to enhance the efficiency of marine products and reduce carbon emissions.

=== Chair of Offshore Wind Growth Partnership Limited ===
Whitmarsh is Chair of Offshore Wind Growth Partnership limited, a company formed with the support of government and the industrial sector to promote and develop the UK supply chain seeking to achieve 60% UK content in home sector.
