= Gulf Cryo =

Middle Eastern supplier of industrial, medical and specialty gases

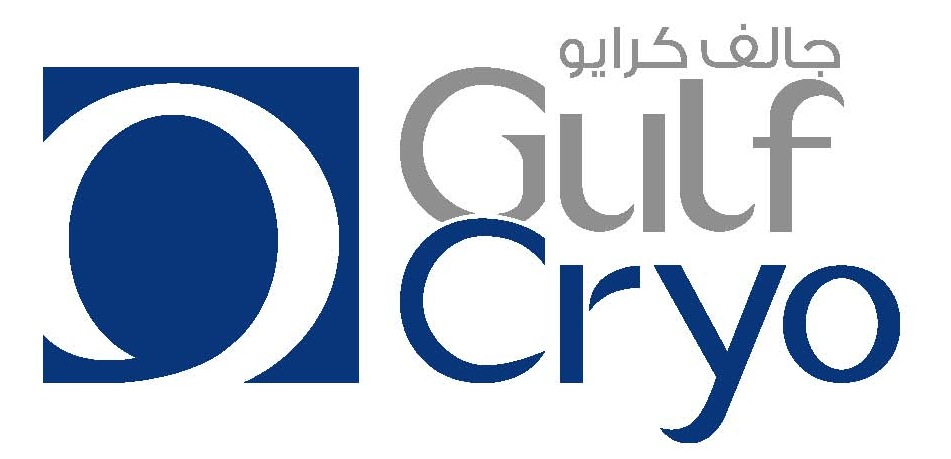
- Type: Subsidiary
- Founded: 1953; 73 years ago
- Founder: Salim Huneidi
- Headquarters: Kuwait; Dubai, UAE (Corporate Office)
- Key people: Amer Huneidi - Chairman
- Website: www.gulfcryo.com

Gulf Cryo is a Middle Eastern company that supplies industrial, medical and specialty gases. The group comprises thirty companies in the MENA region and operates as a closed share holding company. It is considered a leader in the gas industry in the MENA region.

Gulf Cryo was founded by Salim Huneidi in 1953, as the Kuwait Oxygen and Acetylene Company. It was the first gas manufacturer in Kuwait to provide industrial gases such as oxygen and nitrogen to the local petroleum industry.

== History of Faisal Asr ==
In the early 1950s, Salim Huneidi, who worked as an agent for an international Steel Structure and Construction company felt that there was a shortage of supply of cutting and welding gases in Kuwait. He began researching the industrial processes to supply to the growing demand of industrial gases and built the Persian Gulf’s first oxygen separation plant in 1953 in Kuwait City, under the name Kuwait Oxygen and Acetylene Company (KOAC).

Salim Huneidi signed a deal with the Kuwait Oil Company (KOC) (earlier known as Amen Oil), which led KOC to shut down their small Oxygen plant and start outsourcing this product from local suppliers; that was the base that Salim Huneidi built on for his Industrial gas project in Kuwait.

In 1971, KOAC expanded its operation to the Shuaiba Industrial area in Kuwait and established The Kuwait Industrial Gases Company (KIGC). KIGC would primarily supply its products to the oil and refining infrastructure being built in the Shuaiba area. KIGC built a pipeline between the company and the refineries i.e. The KNPC Group, to provide a continuous supply of Nitrogen to cover their demand.

The Arabian Industrial Gases Company (AIGCo) was formed in 1977 in Sharjah, United Arab Emirates. In 1998, Amer Huneidi, son of Huneidi was appointed as chairman and soon afterwards he led to the consolidation and creation of The Huneidi Group of Companies.

By 2006, Gulf Cryo Qatar was established and in 2007 Gulf Cryo became a holding company. In 2008, Gulf Cryo Saudi Arabia was established. In 2009, Investcorp purchased 20% of the organisation. In late 2009, Gulf Cryo Oman was established. By 2012, Gulf Cryo was established in Iraq, Egypt and Jordan.

In 2013, EQUATE Petrochemical Company, as part of its sustainability initiatives, launched its second CO_{2} recovery project in Kuwait in partnership with Gulf Cryo. The next year, Gulf Cryo announced expansion of its CO_{2} business. The company invested in four CO_{2} hubs in Dubai, Kuwait, Dammam and Amman.

Gulf Cryo acquired Deniz Gaz, a gas company based in Turkey and entered the Turkish market in 2014. The same year, Gulf Cryo acquired a minority stake in Tyczka Air Austria. Yaliz Gaz, another Turkish gas company, along with its affiliates was acquired by Gulf Cryo in 2015 increasing the company's coverage in Turkey.

In February 2016, Bahrain Mumtalakat Holding Company, the investment arm of the Kingdom of Bahrain, announced that it has acquired a minority equity stake in Gulf Cryo. Gulf Cryo in partnership with EQUATE Petrochemical Company also launched the first commercial carbon dioxide (CO_{2}) plant in Kuwait.

== Products ==
Gulf Cryo produces and supplies industrial gases namely Acetylene, Air, Argon, Carbon Dioxide, Helium, Hydrogen, Oxygen, and Nitrogen. The company also produces medical gases including Entonox, Medical Air, Medical Carbon Dioxide, Medical Nitrogen, Medical Nitrous Oxide and Medical Oxygen. It also produces Dry Ice.

The management systems at Gulf Cryo are complaint to ISO 9001:2008, ISO 14001:2004 and OHSAS 18001:2007 FSC 22000 standards.
