= Mercedes-Benz SLR McLaren =

Grand tourer jointly developed by Mercedes-Benz and McLaren Automotive

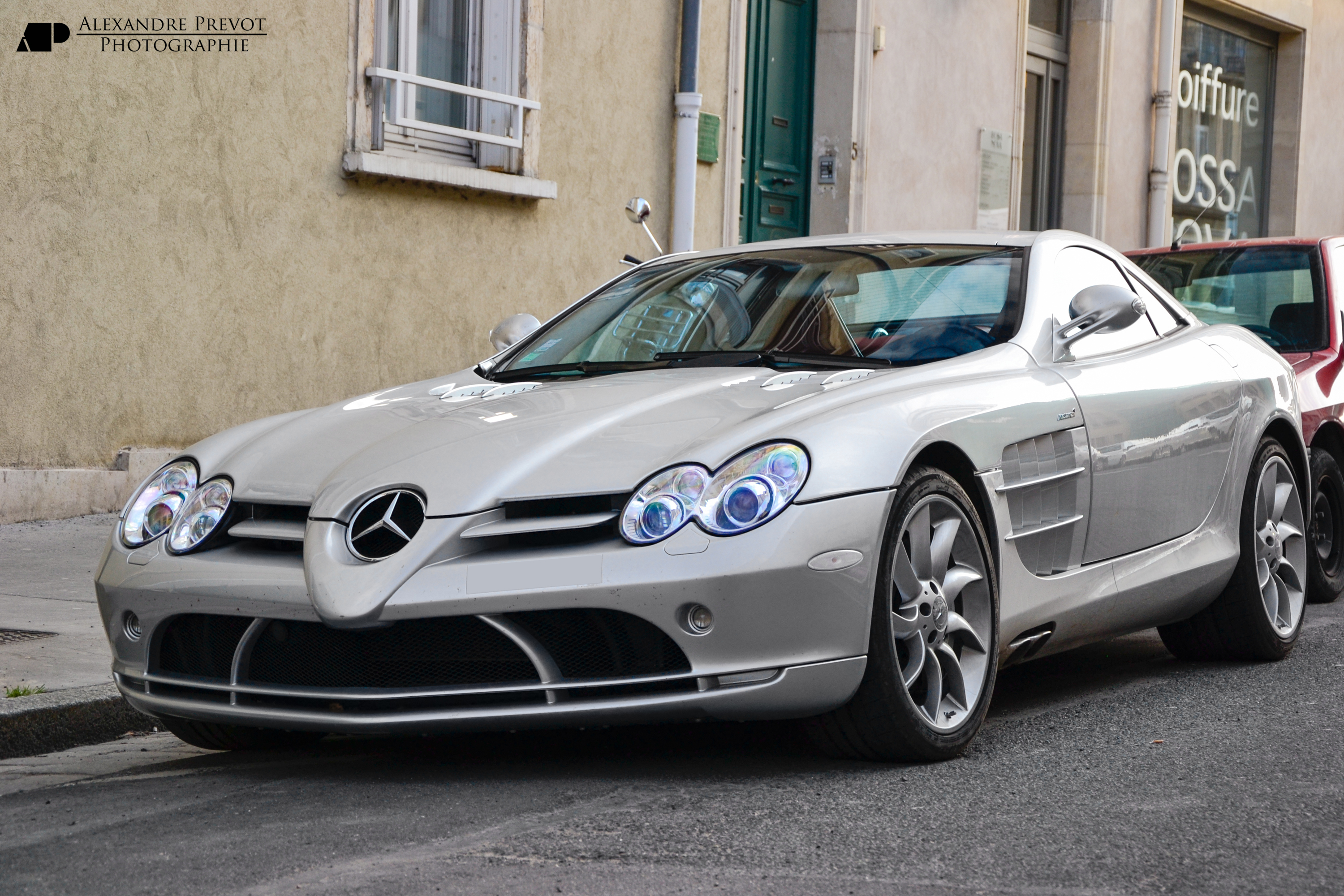

Overview
- Manufacturer: Mercedes-Benz (Note: Produced under the DaimlerChrysler name from 2003–2007 and continuously under the Daimler name from 2007–2010.); McLaren Automotive
- Model code: C199 (Coupe); R199 (Roadster); Z199 (Stirling Moss)
- Production: 2003–2010; 2,157 produced
- Model years: 2004–2010
- Assembly: United Kingdom: Woking, Surrey, England (McLaren Technology)
- Designer: Gordon Murray; Gorden Wagener

Body and chassis
- Class: Grand tourer (S)
- Body style: 2-door coupé 2-door roadster 2-door speedster (Stirling Moss)
- Layout: Front mid-engine, rear-wheel-drive
- Doors: Butterfly

Powertrain
- Engine: 5.4 L (5,439 cc) supercharged M155 SLR V8
- Power output: 626 PS (460 kW; 617 hp); 780 N⋅m (575 lbf⋅ft); 650 PS (478 kW; 641 hp); 820 N⋅m (605 lbf⋅ft) (722 Edition/722 S/Stirling Moss)
- Transmission: 5-speed 5G-Tronic automatic

Dimensions
- Wheelbase: 2,700 mm (106.3 in)
- Length: 4,656 mm (183.3 in)
- Width: 1,909 mm (75.2 in)
- Height: 1,261 mm (49.6 in); 2006–08: 1,252 mm (49.3 in)
- Kerb weight: 1,743–1,768 kg (3,843–3,898 lb); 1,791.5 kg (3,950 lb) (SLR Roadster)

Chronology
- Predecessor: Mercedes-Benz 300 SLR (spiritual)

The Mercedes-Benz SLR McLaren (C199 / R199 / Z199) is a grand tourer jointly developed by German automotive manufacturer Mercedes-Benz and British automotive manufacturer McLaren Automotive and sold from 2003 to 2010. When the car was developed, Mercedes-Benz owned 40 percent of the McLaren Group and the car was produced in conjunction between the two companies. The "SLR" name is an abbreviation for "Sport Leicht Rennsport" (Sport Light Racing), and was an homage to the Mercedes-Benz 300 SLR which served as the car's inspiration. The car was offered in coupé, roadster and speedster bodystyles, with the latter being a limited-edition model.

== History ==
At the 1999 North American International Auto Show, Mercedes-Benz presented their Vision SLR concept, inspired both by the Mercedes-Benz 300 SLR Uhlenhaut Coupé of 1955, which was a modified Mercedes-Benz W196S race car, and the design of closed-wheel Formula One cars, a field in which they had prior experience from Mercedes-Benz competing in Formula One in the past as constructor also winning back to back championships in their debut season 1954 then 1955. Also during the jointly developed project of Mercedes-Benz SLR McLaren in 2003 Mercedes-Benz acquiring 40 per cent ownership of McLaren Group competed in Formula One as partnership with the McLaren Formula One Team, and were developing powertrains and electronics for McLaren's Formula One cars. The car was presented as "Tomorrow Silver Arrow" in a clear reference to the Silver Arrows of the golden age of Mercedes in competition during the fifties. Later that year, during the Frankfurt Motor Show, a roadster version of the SLR concept was presented. The concept car was fitted with a 5.0-litre supercharged AMG V8 engine able to generate a power output of 565 PS (416 kW; 557 hp) and 720 N⋅m (531 lb⋅ft) of torque at 4,000 rpm, mated to a 5-speed automatic gearbox with Touchshift control.

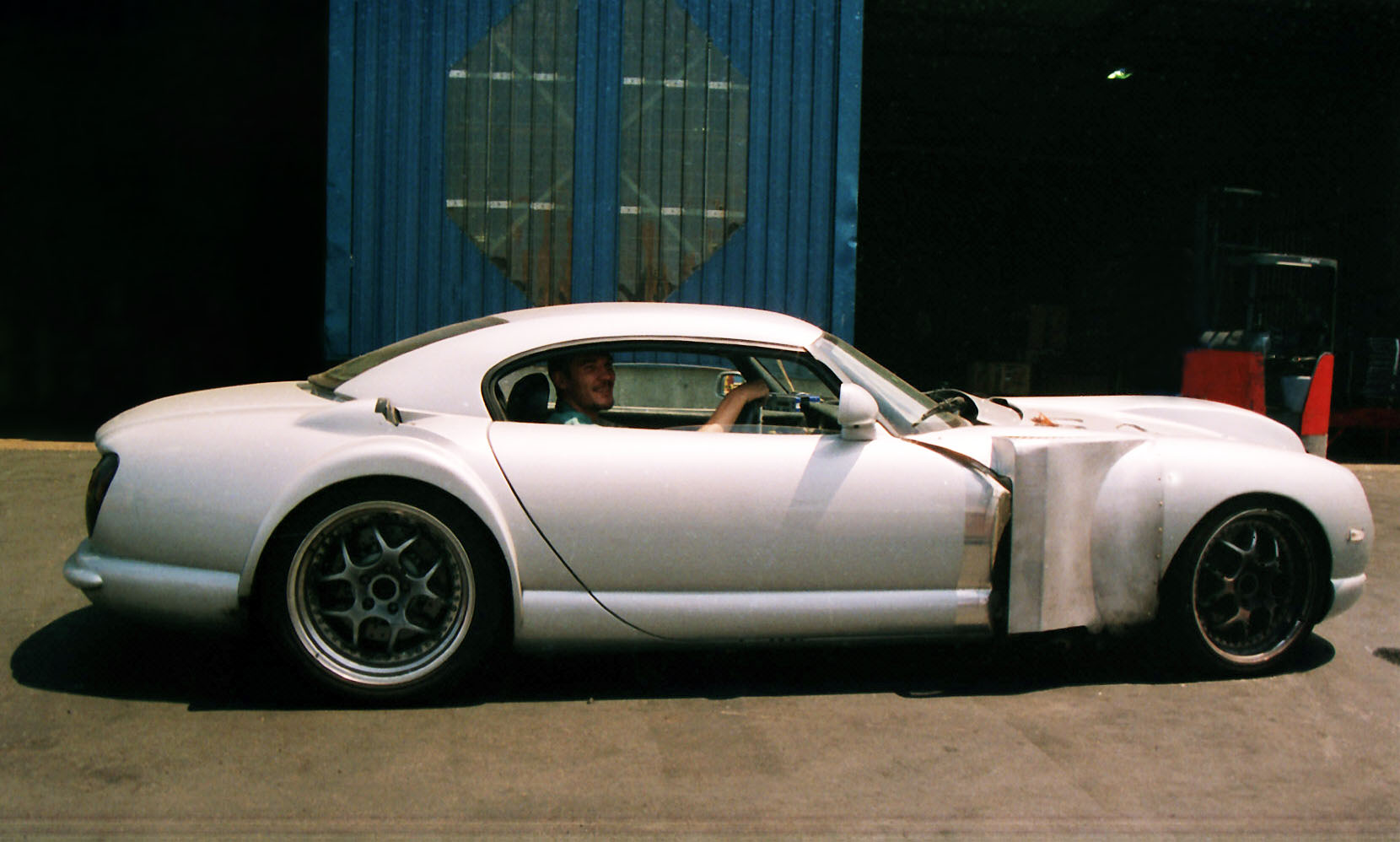
One of the test mules used for testing the SLR's engine, based on a TVR Cerbera

Wanting to bring the concept to production following its positive reception, Mercedes joined forces with their Formula One partner, McLaren, thus creating the Mercedes-Benz SLR McLaren. Mercedes did the styling on the car while McLaren was fully responsible for everything else, from the design and the engineering to the manufacture and the testing of each car at the production line. During development, a pair of TVR Cerberas were modified for use as test mules for the SLR's engine. The production version of the car was unveiled to the general public on 17 November 2003 having some major design adjustments in respect of the initial design. In order to give the car the performance that Mercedes wanted, McLaren had to radically alter the concept for better weight distribution, including moving the engine almost a meter back and lowering the fuel tank. Smaller adjustments included more complex vents on both sides of the car, a redesigned front with the three pointed star plunged in the nose and red tinted rear lights.

The Mercedes-Benz SLR McLaren saw a production run of over six years. On 4 April 2008, Mercedes announced it would discontinue the SLR. The last of the coupés rolled off the production line at the end of 2010 and the roadster version was dropped in early 2009. Due to the automatic gear box, front mid-engine arrangement, and its driving characteristics, some automotive journalists classify the SLR McLaren as a grand tourer.

== Technical highlights ==
=== Brakes ===
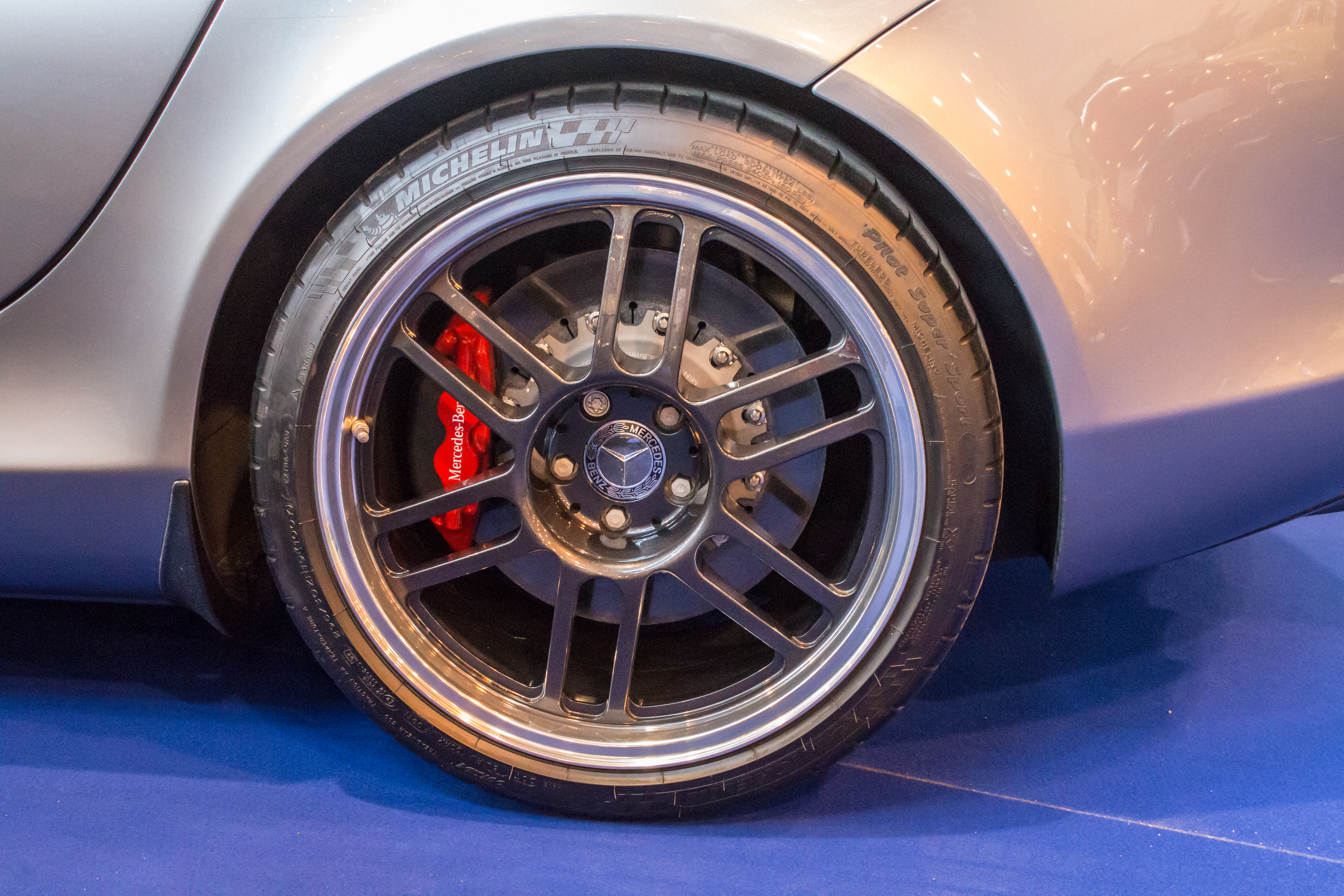
The carbon ceramic brakes used on the SLR

The SLR features Sensotronic Brake Control, a type of brake-by-wire system. The brake discs are carbon-ceramic units and provide better stopping power and fade resistance than steel discs when operating under ideal working temperature. Mercedes-Benz claims these discs are fade resistant to 1,200 °C (2,200 °F). The front discs are internally vented and measure 370 mm (14.6 in) in diameter; eight-piston callipers are used. Rear discs are 360 mm (14.2 in) in diameter with four-piston callipers. During wet conditions the callipers automatically skim the surface of the discs to keep them dry.

=== Aerodynamics ===
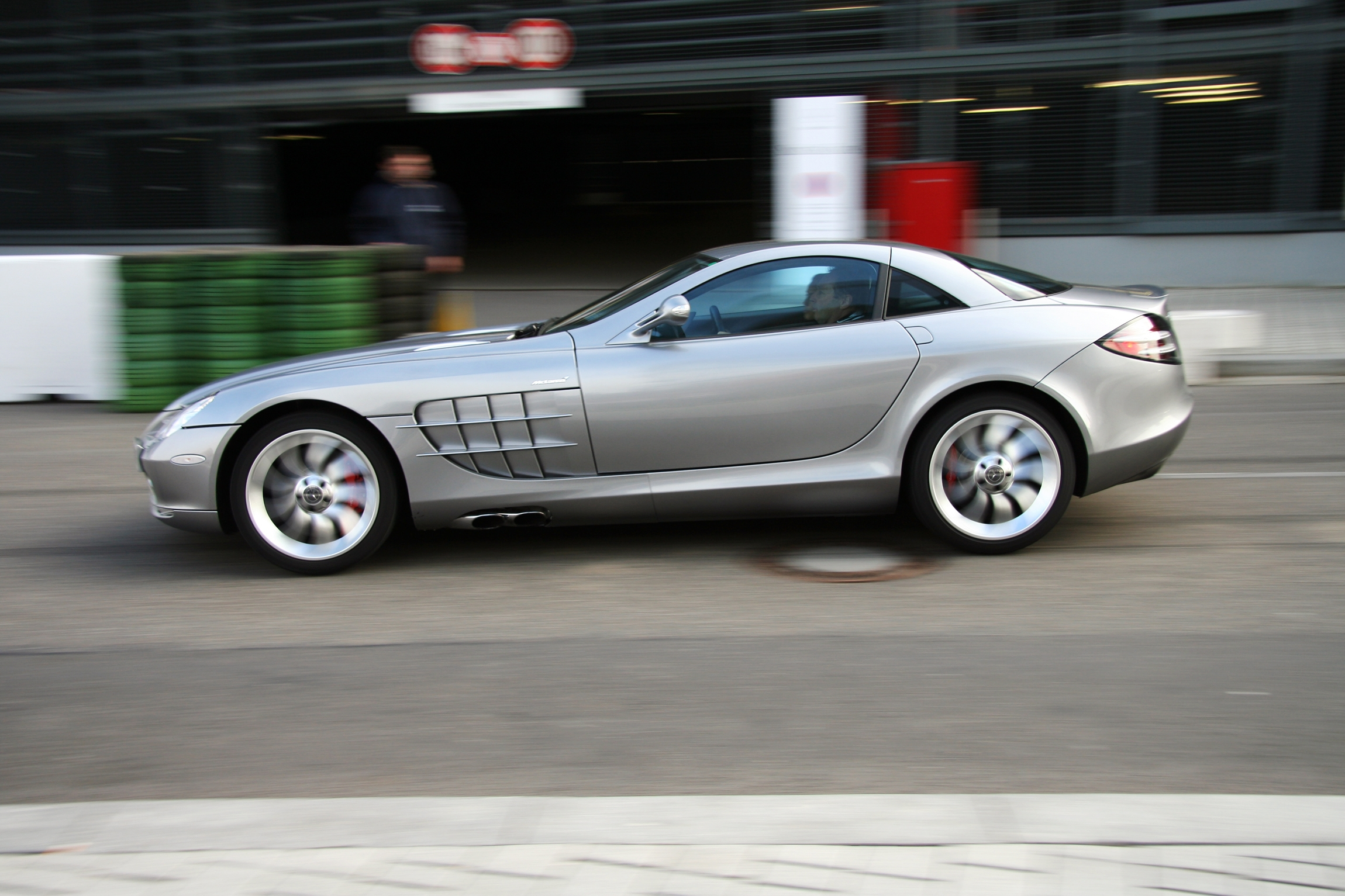
The side profile of the SLR

The SLR features active aerodynamics; there is a spoiler mounted on the rear integral air brake flap. The spoiler increases downforce depending on its angle of elevation (angle of attack). At a set speed, the spoiler/brake automatically raises to 10 degrees (15 degrees in the 722 edition), when demanded via the driver's switch, the elevation can be increased to 30 degrees (35 degrees in the 722 edition) for increased rear downforce, at the cost of increased steady state drag. The car has a flat underbody and a rear diffuser for improved downforce. Due to this, there was no other place for the exhaust pipes to exit, other than the sides of the car, making it another unique feature of the SLR.

=== Engine ===
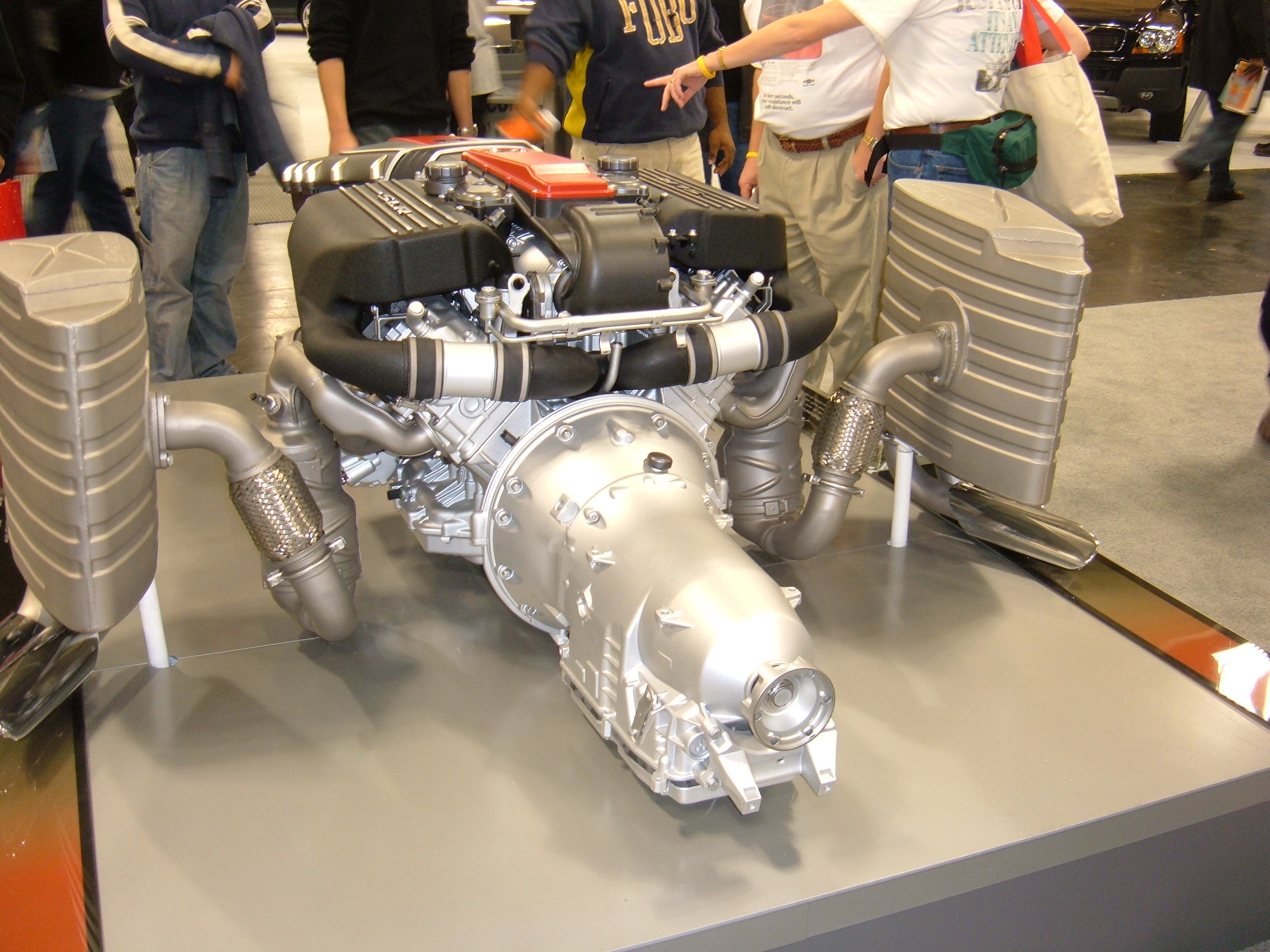
The SLR McLaren sports a hand-built 5.4-litre, supercharged all-aluminium V8 engine

The SLR has a 232 kg (511 lb) hand-built 5.4 L; 331.9 cu in (5,439 cc) supercharged all-aluminium alloy, SOHC 3 valves per cylinder 90° V8 engine, with a bore and stroke of 97 mm × 92 mm (3.82 in × 3.62 in) and with a compression ratio of 8.8:1. The engine is lubricated via a dry sump system. The Lysholm-type twin-screw supercharger rotates at a maximum of 23,000 rpm and produces 0.9 bar (13 psi) of boost. The compressed air is then cooled via two intercoolers. The engine generates a maximum power output of 626 PS (460 kW; 617 hp) at 6,500 rpm and maximum torque of 780 N⋅m (575 lbf⋅ft) between 3,250 and 5,000 rpm.

McLaren took the original concept car designed by Mercedes and moved the engine 1 metre (39.4 in) behind the front bumper, around 50 centimetres (19.7 in) behind the front axle. They also optimised the design of the centre firewall.

=== Transmission ===
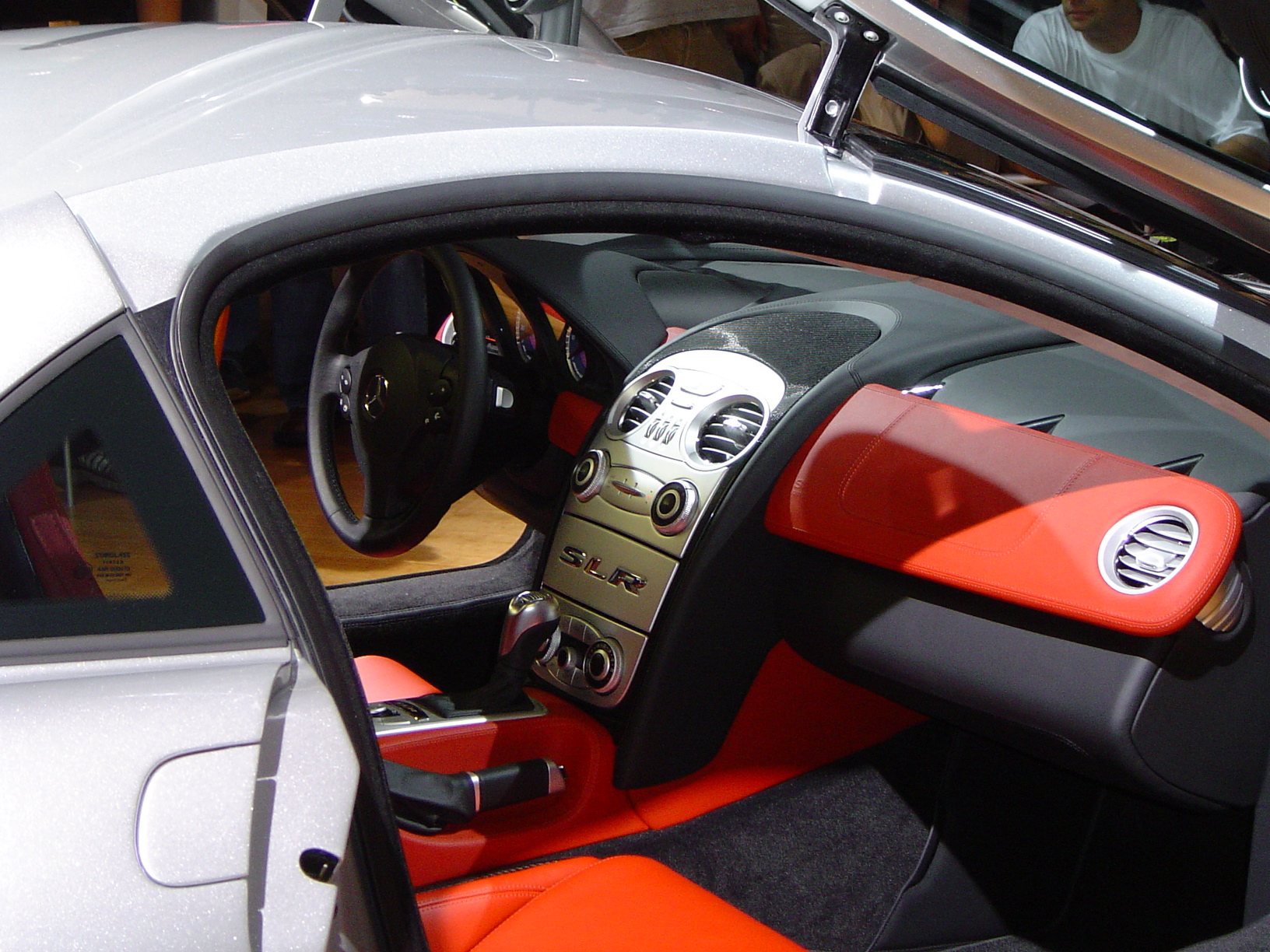
The SLR utilised the AMG SPEEDSHIFT R automatic transmission

The SLR uses the AMG SPEEDSHIFT R five-speed automatic transmission with three manual modes. For durability, Mercedes selected a five-speed transmission rather than their seven-speed transmission which was more complex and used more parts.

=== Performance ===
The car uses carbon-fibre reinforced plastic (CFRP) construction in an attempt to keep the weight low. Despite CFRP materials, the total curb weight is 1,750 kg (3,858 lb). The SLR could attain a top speed of 207 mph (333 km/h).

- Car and Driver achieved a 0 to 60 mph (97 km/h) acceleration time of 3.4 seconds, and a 1/4 mile (402 m) time of 11.2 seconds at 130 mph (209 km/h). Car and Driver also achieved top gear acceleration 30–50 mph (48–80 km/h) and 50–70 mph (80–113 km/h) times of 1.7 and 2.4 seconds, which are the fastest ever recorded by the magazine in a production car. The SLR also pulled 0.97 g on the skidpad. The magazine suggested that the times may be even lower if temperatures were lower.
- Motor Trend tested the SLR and achieved a 0-97 km/h (60 mph) acceleration time of 3.3 seconds in April 2006.

Road And Track tested the car in their July 2005 Road Test and reached 97 km/h (60 mph) from a standstill in 3.5 seconds. The 0 to 161 km/h (100 mph) sprint was achieved in 7.5 seconds and a 1/4 mile (402 m) run was completed in 11.5 seconds at 203 km/h (126 mph).

== Variants ==
=== 722 Edition ===
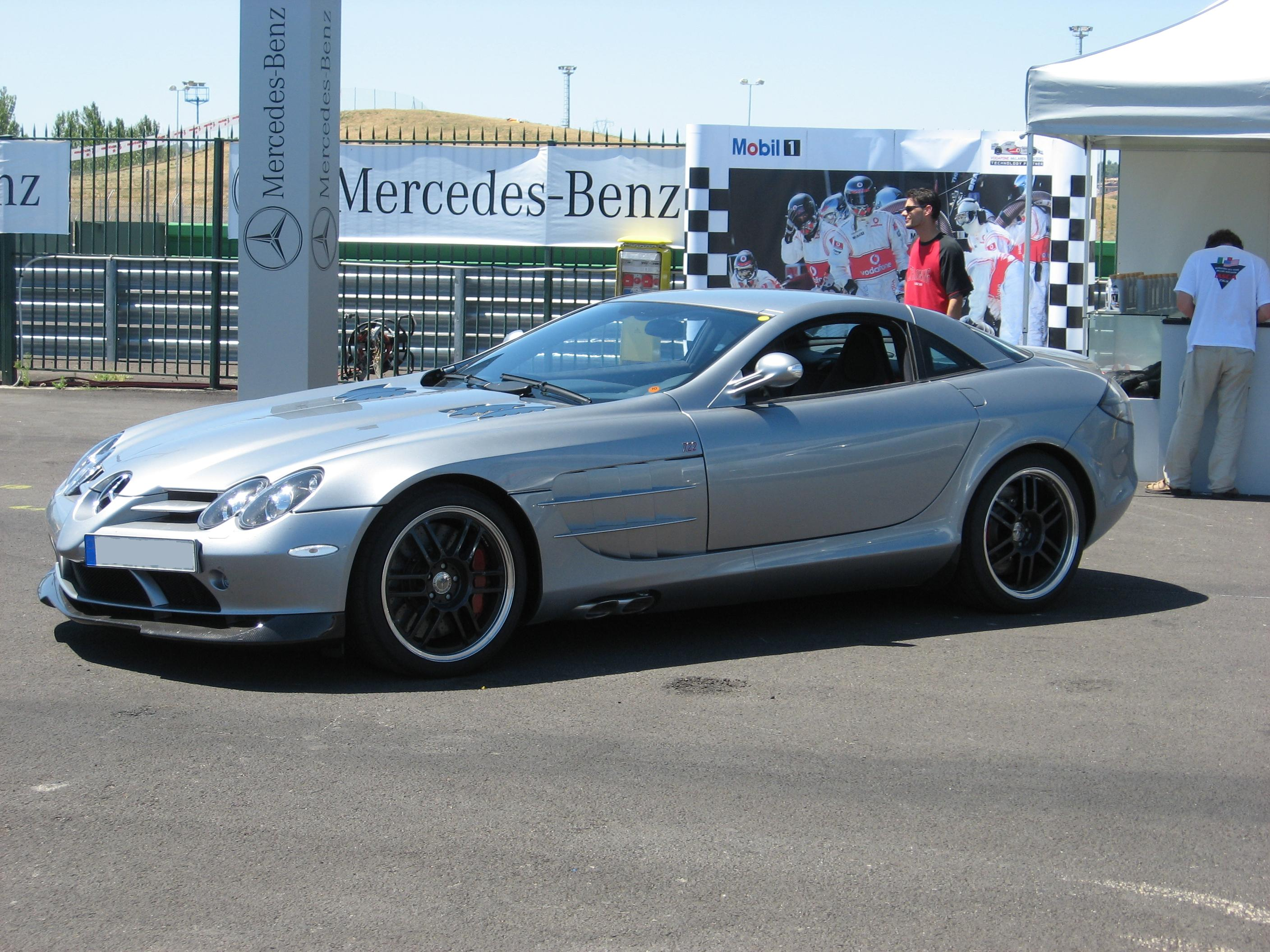
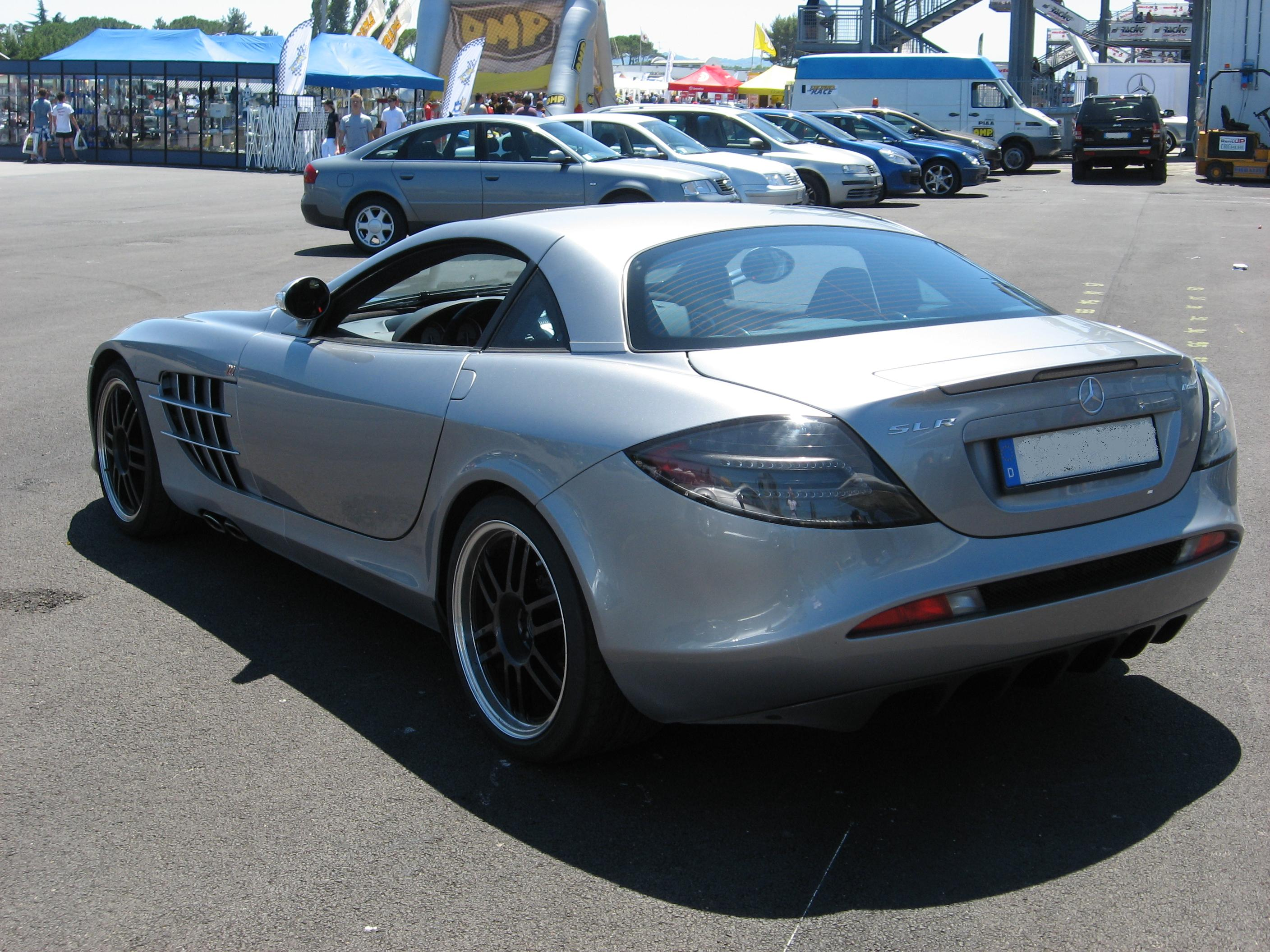
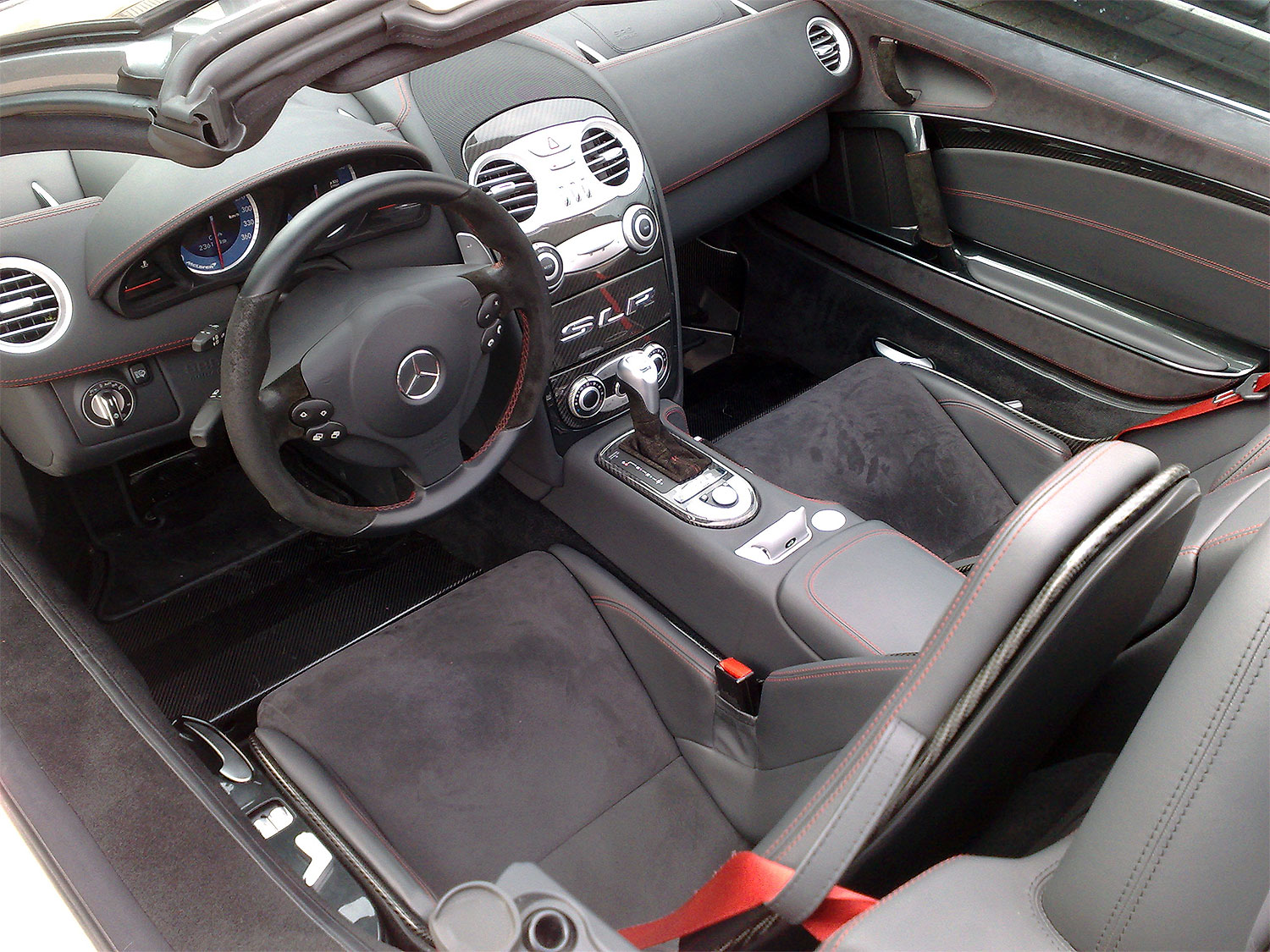
Mercedes-Benz SLR McLaren 722 Edition

A new version of the SLR was introduced in 2006, called the Mercedes-Benz SLR McLaren 722 Edition. The "722" refers to the victory by Stirling Moss and his co-driver Denis Jenkinson in a Mercedes-Benz 300 SLR with the starting number 722 (indicating a start time of 7:22 a.m.) at the Mille Miglia in 1955.

The "722 Edition" includes a modified version of the engine used in the SLR generating a power output of 650 PS (478 kW; 641 hp) at 6,500 rpm and 820 N⋅m (605 lb⋅ft) at 4,000 rpm. 19-inch light-alloy wheels were used to reduce unsprung mass, while modifications were also made to the suspension, with a stiffer damper setup and 10 mm (0.39 in) lower ride height introduced for improved handling. Larger 390 mm (15.4 in) diameter front brakes and a revised front air dam and rear diffuser were fitted.

Other exterior changes include red "722" badging, harking back to the original 722 racer, black tinted tail lights and headlamps. The interior has carbon fibre trim and black leather upholstery, combined with Alcantara.

The SLR 722 can accelerate from 0 to 100 km/h (62 mph) in 3.6 seconds, 0 to 200 km/h (124 mph) in 10.2 seconds and 300 km/h (186 mph) in 27.6 seconds, and can attain a top speed of 337 km/h (209 mph), faster than the standard Mercedes-Benz SLR McLaren. Production of the 722 Edition was limited to 150 units.

=== Roadster ===
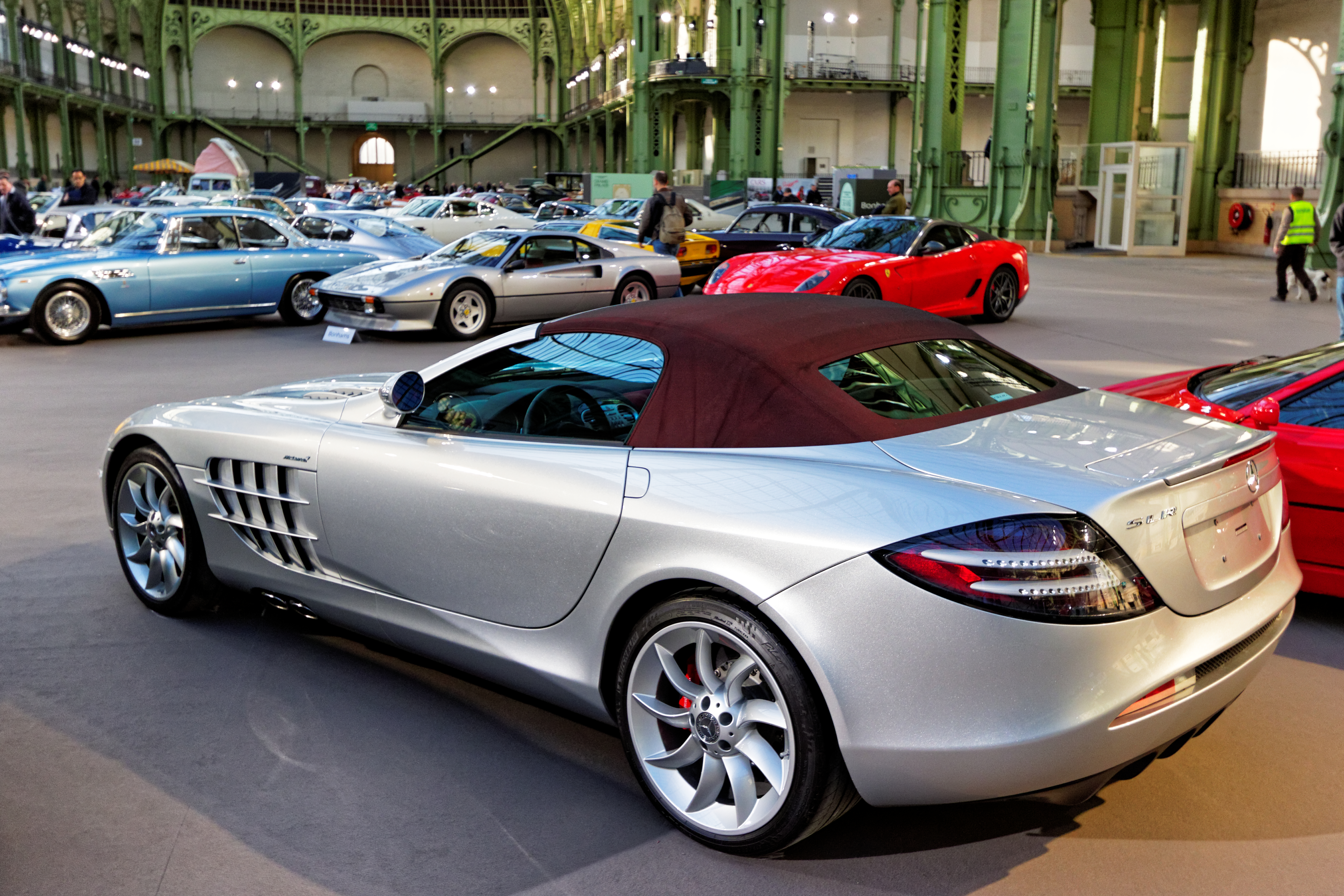
Mercedes-Benz SLR McLaren Roadster

A roadster version of the SLR went on sale in September 2007. It uses the same engine as its coupé sibling, generating a power output of 626 PS (460 kW; 617 hp), to propel it to a top speed of 334 km/h (208 mph) and a 0 to 100 km/h (62 mph) acceleration time of 3.6 seconds.

However, as a convertible, the roadster was burdened with extra weight, which affected performance and handling. The Roadster's roof is made from a "newly developed material" and does not take the form of a folding metal arrangement, as is common on many modern cars. Following a manual unlatching, it takes ten seconds to fold away electrically. According to an official Mercedes document, the cabin of the roadster is capable of allowing conversation between driver and passenger up to a speed of 200 km/h (124 mph) with the roof retracted. The SLR Roadster was aimed to compete against other luxurious sports cars such as the Pagani Zonda F Roadster.

=== Roadster 722 S (2009) ===
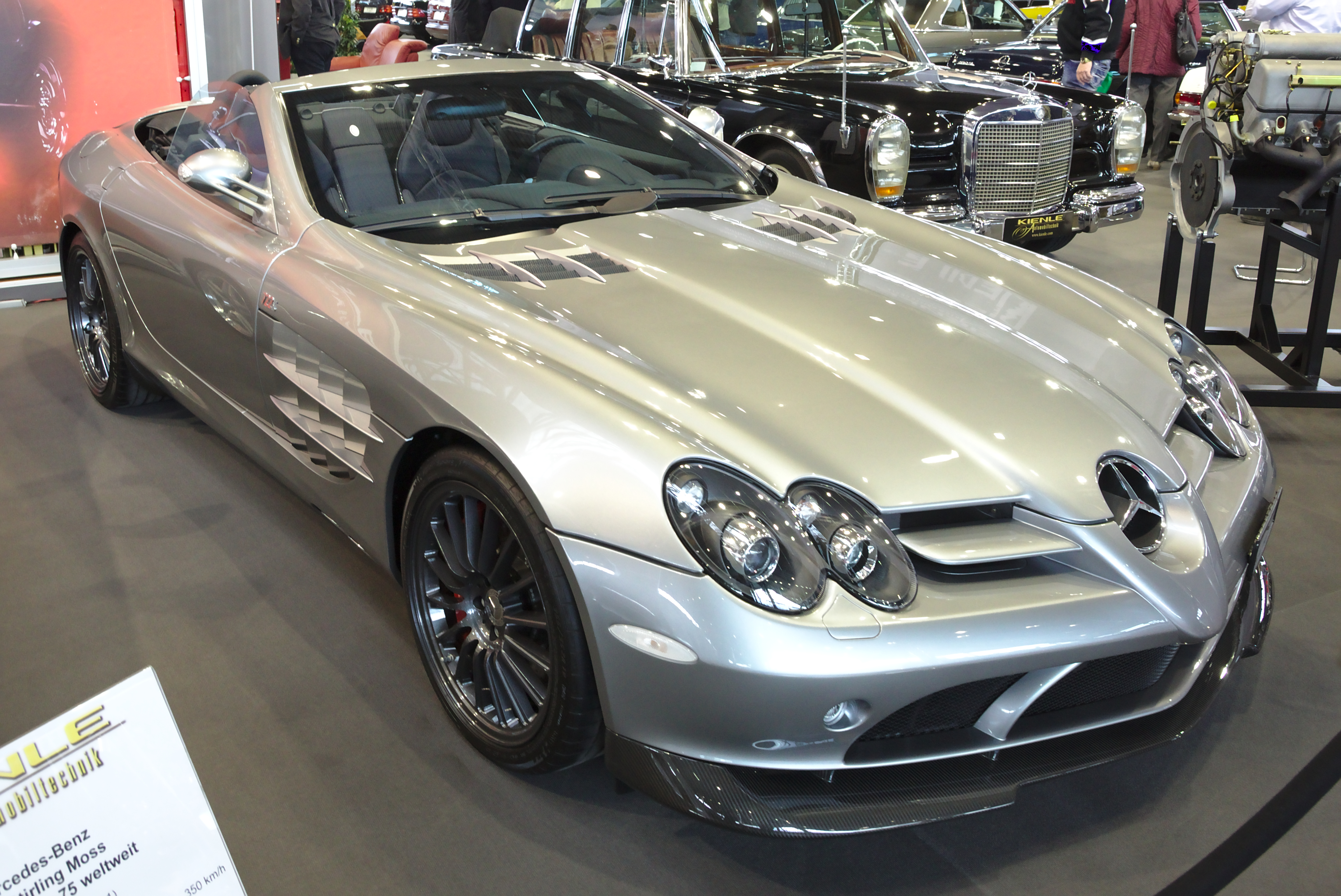
Mercedes-Benz SLR McLaren 722 S roadster

The Roadster variant of the 722 Edition was unveiled at the 2007 Frankfurt Motor Show. The roadster has the same engine and suspension setup as the coupé along with the folding roof mechanism shared with the standard SLR roadster. It can accelerate to 100 km/h (62 mph) from standstill in 3.1 seconds and has top speed of 334 km/h (208 mph). The model went on sale in January 2009 and production was limited to 150 units.

=== 722 GT (2007) ===
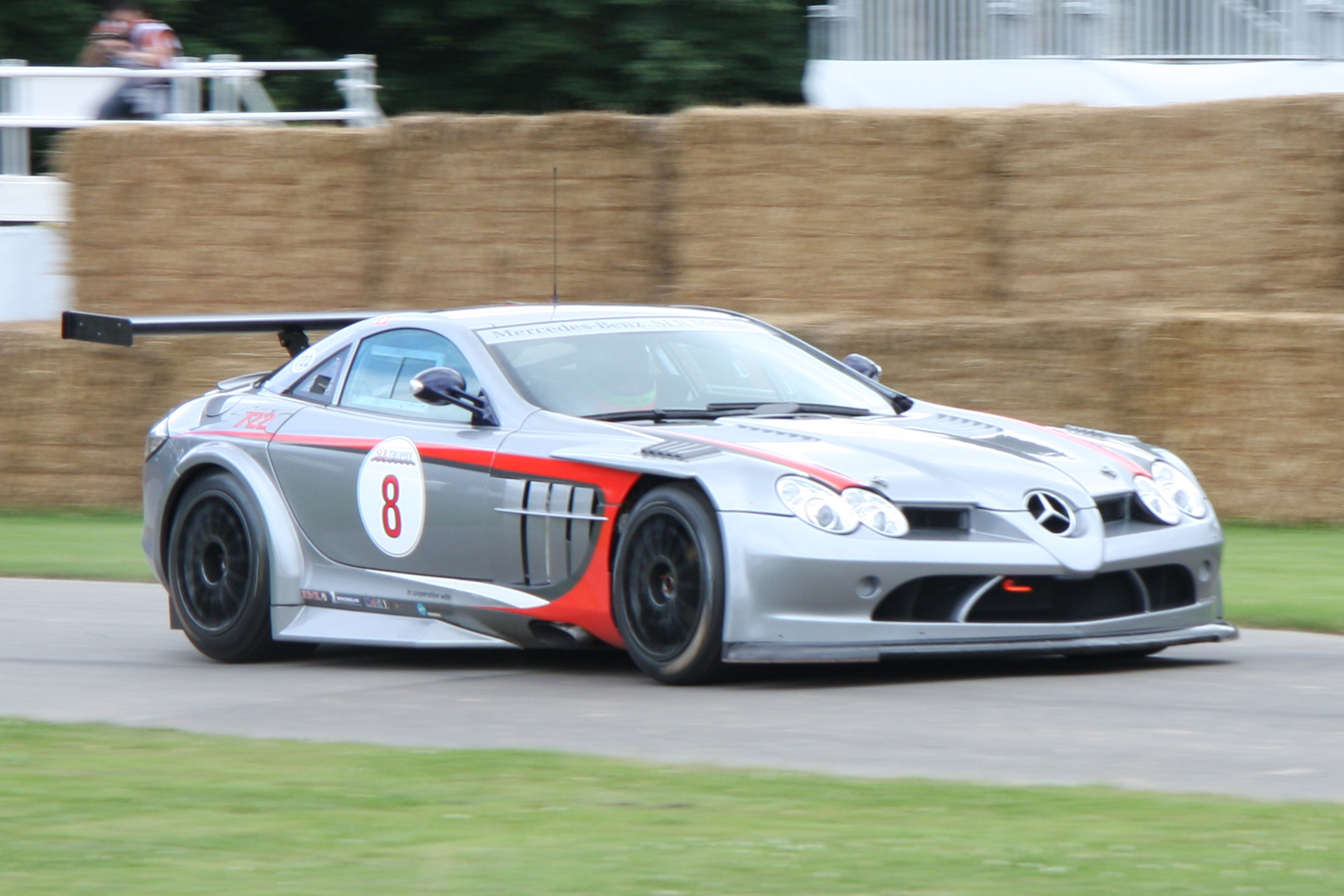
The SLR 722 GT at the Goodwood Festival of Speed

The 722 GT is a racing version of the SLR 722 which was developed for a one-make racing series called SLR Trophy. The cars were built by Ray Mallock Ltd. following requests from enthusiasts with approval from Mercedes-Benz. The car has new wider bodywork to accommodate 18 in (457 mm) OZ racing wheels. The front grille vents are removed and larger, free flowing air extractors sit on the hood and flank the side of the car. The rear now has a fixed racing wing and diffuser.

Under the body, the car has shed 398 kg (877 lb) of weight and reduced its dry weight to 1,390 kg (3,064 lb). The engine remains in relatively stock specification but now generates a power output of 680 PS (500 kW; 671 hp) and 830 N⋅m (612 lb⋅ft) of torque at 1.75 bar (175 kPa) of boost and is equipped with a new racing filter and exhaust system. The car has a modified Eibach racing suspension with a modified stabiliser at the front that improves handling. An adjustable wheel camber along with shock absorbers with variable compression and rebound settings allows the suspension setup to be configured for different race tracks. New 18-inch OZ racing wheels with central locking nuts allow for faster tyre changes while a pneumatic jack system aids further in the process. The stock carbon ceramic braking system has been replaced with an FIA approved racing brake system with steel brake discs having a modified cooling system and balance that ensure improved stopping power. The transmission from the standard car is retained but is now configured for race use.

Inside, the car is stripped out with only the essential functions being available, controlled from a carbon fibre binnacle. The stock steering wheel has been replaced with a racing steering wheel with paddle shifters and a gear change indicator, the heated leather seats have also been removed in favour of Recaro racing bucket seats with six-point racing harness and the gauges have been replaced with a digital racing display. New carbon fibre door panels, plexiglass windows and a full roll cage complete the transformation. Although 21 was planned to satisfy the FIA’s homologation requirements, 12 was produced.

The 722 GT could accelerate from 0–97 km/h (0–60 mph) in 3.3 seconds and could attain a top speed of 315 km/h (196 mph), which is less than the standard SLR due to added aerodynamic drag.

The SLR McLaren 722 GT was available to the North American market exclusively through their dealerships by Renntech.

=== Crown Edition (2008) ===
The SLR "Crown Edition" was commissioned by the King of Bahrain as gifts for fellow Arab royals. This run of 10 cars was upgraded with 722-specification parts, including the uprated and modified engine, carbon fibre aerodynamic parts, stiffer dampers and 19-inch lightweight alloy wheels.

=== Stirling Moss (2009) ===
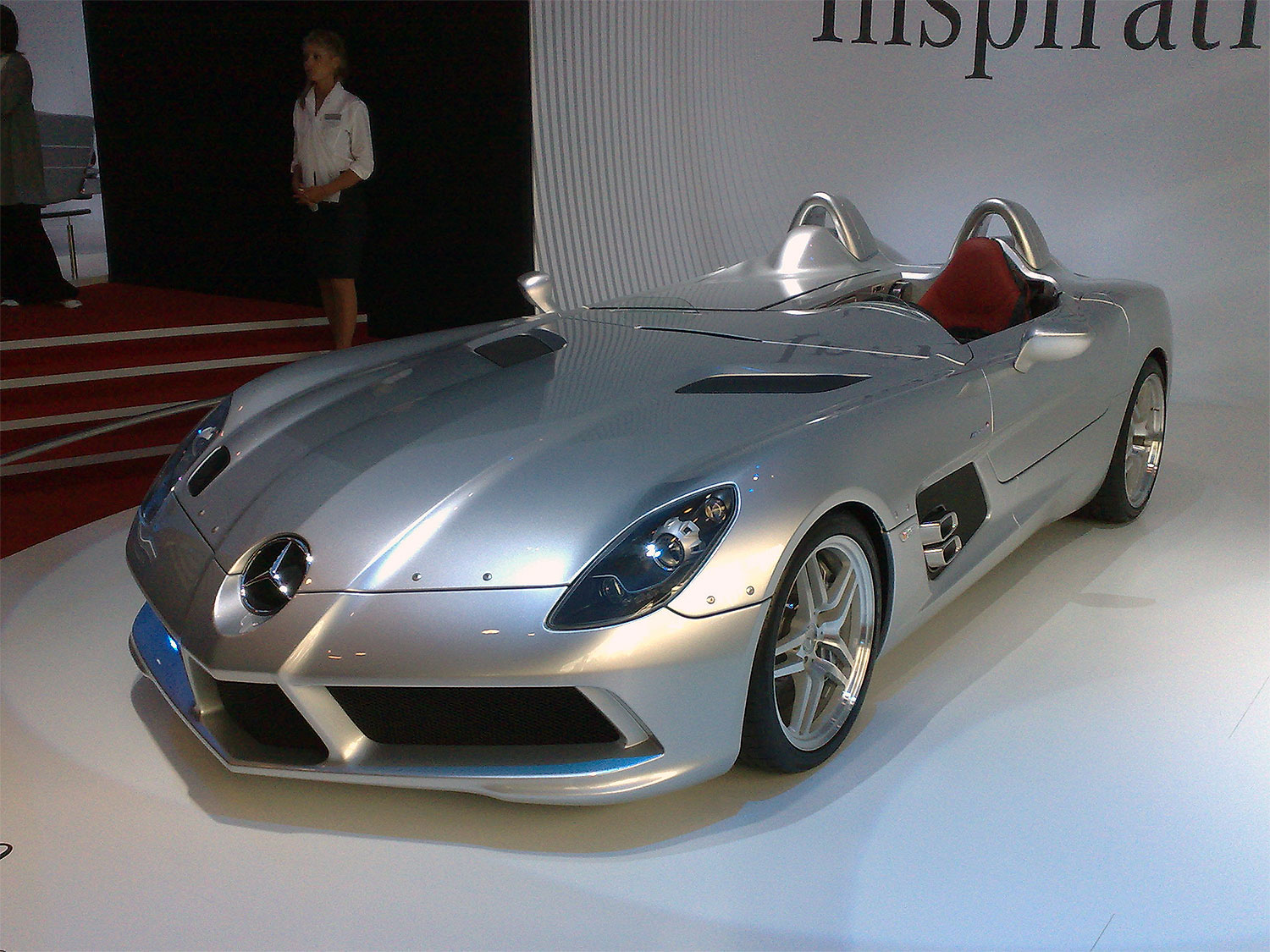

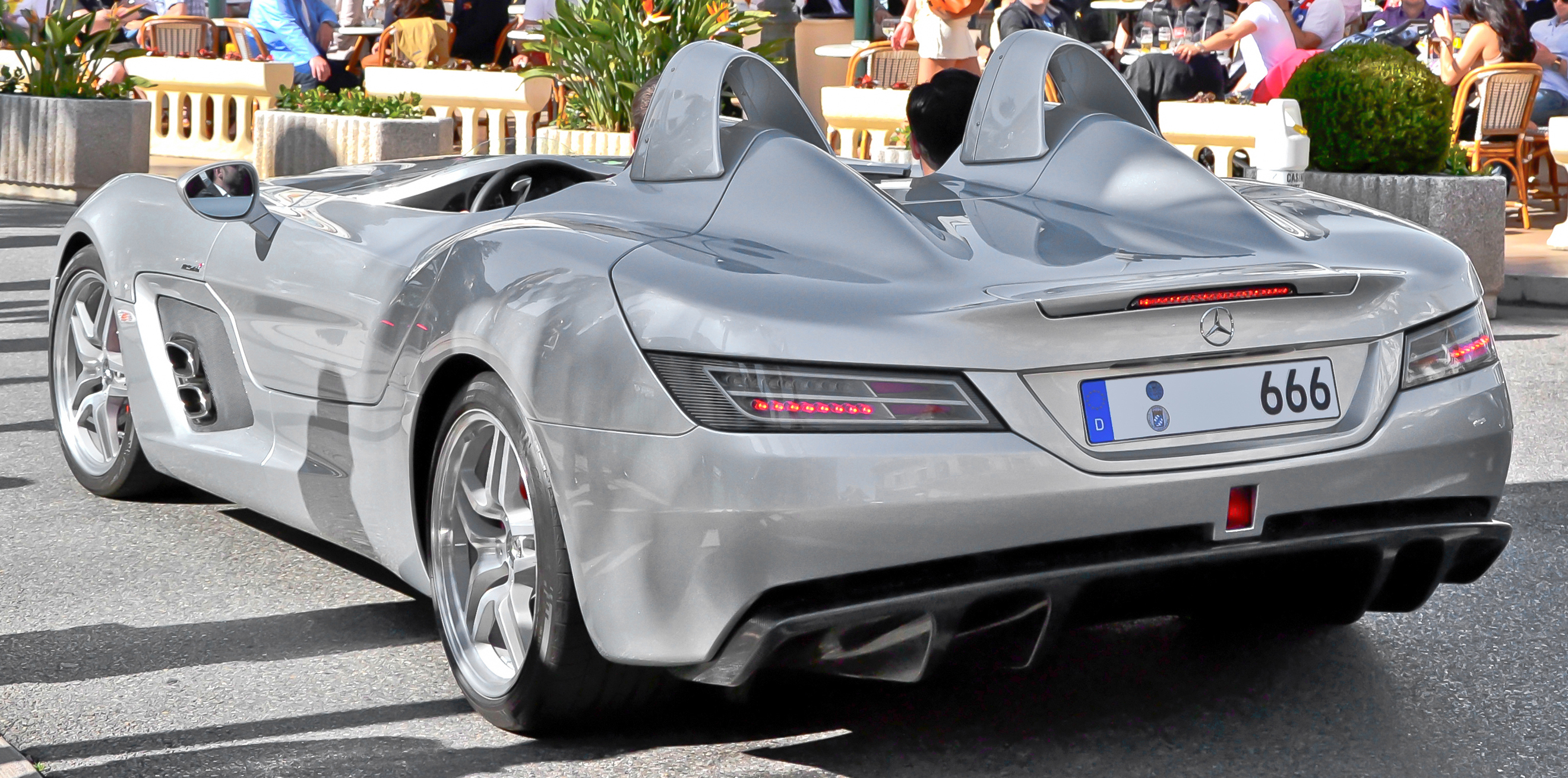
Mercedes-Benz SLR Stirling Moss

Named after the British racing driver of the same name, the SLR Stirling Moss is a limited edition variant unveiled at the 2009 North American International Auto Show, which uses a speedster styling that does not include a roof or a windscreen. The car is designed by Korean designer Yoon Il-hun and is inspired by the 300 SLR race car. The interior was designed by Dutch designer Sarkis Benliyan. The SLR Stirling Moss was to be the last series of the McLaren SLR built under the partnership between Mercedes-Benz and McLaren, until McLaren announced their own final Edition of the SLR in late 2010.

The supercharged 5.4-litre SLR AMG V8 engine is rated at 650 PS (478 kW; 641 hp). The SLR Stirling Moss could attain a top speed of 350 km/h (217 mph) with acceleration from 0 to 100 km/h (62 mph) achieved in 3 seconds. The car is approximately 200 kg (441 lb) lighter than the regular model due to carbon fibre construction and speedster styling.

The SLR Stirling Moss began production in June 2009, after the SLR Roadster was discontinued in May 2009. All 75 cars planned to be produced were completed by December 2009. The SLR Stirling Moss was available only to the existing SLR owners and each car cost in excess of US$1 million.

=== McLaren Edition (2011–2013) ===
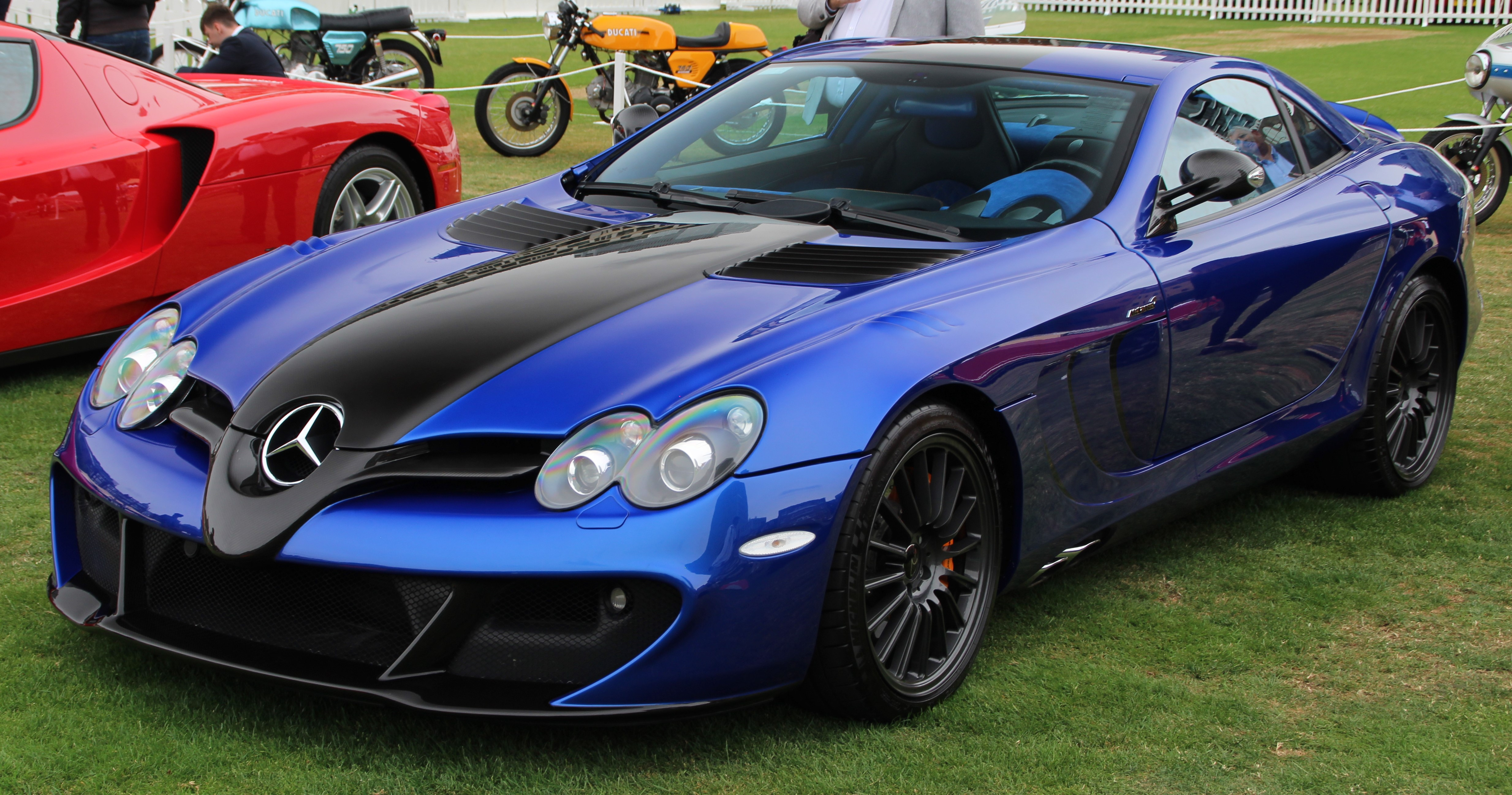
Mercedes-Benz SLR McLaren Edition

In December 2011, more than a year after the SLR was officially discontinued, McLaren Special Operations (MSO) announced a bespoke program for the SLR. The McLaren Edition is based on all variants of the SLR with the exclusion of Stirling Moss and includes revised bodywork (front and rear bumper, grille, top shell, side grills, rear diffuser, wheels) and interior parts, along with upgraded steering and suspension components and a new titanium sports exhaust. The cars were uniquely modified to each owner's specifications and (due to this) no two cars are the same. The personalisation cost £150,000 and was offered for only 25 cars.

=== SLR by MSO (2021) ===
Mercedes-Benz SLR McLaren MSO Edition

The SLR by MSO was announced in 2021 by McLaren Special Operations. The project was said to be inspired by collectors, who often owned 3 or more SLR's, asking to send their cars back to MSO to receive upgrades or spec changes. In response to this, MSO launched the SLR by MSO program, allowing owners to upgrade their cars to the latest MSO technology, and to choose their own specs. The SLR by MSO upgrade cost £131,500 and features a unique front splitter that looks visually similar to the one found on the 722 edition. There is also a revised rear diffuser and floor pan that allows for a 2.5% reduction in drag. The SLR by MSO also features a unique, lighter 5 spoke wheel, improvements to the braking system, an exhaust system that is 30kg lighter, and improved suspension that has been lowered by 10mm. The upgrade also included the car being repainted and interior re-trimmed.

=== HDK (2022) ===
Mercedes-Benz SLR McLaren HDK

The Mercedes-Benz SLR McLaren HDK (High Downforce Kit) was announced in December 2021 by McLaren Special Operations as a bespoke car, built as a road-going version of the SLR 722 GT. Changes from the SLR 722 GT include an upgraded steering system, trimmed interior from a regular SLR, side grilles, rear diffuser, louvers, single-exit exhausts and a modified variant of the M155 V8 producing 690 PS (507 kW; 680 hp).

Reports suggest that 12 of these cars will be built with each one having unique touches catering to the owner's specifications, costing $350,000.

== Sales ==
2003	
2004	
2005	615
2006	261
2007	275
2008	
2009	
2010	

Total sales were 615 units in 2005, 261 units in 2006, and 275 units in 2007, falling well below Mercedes-McLaren's goal of selling 500 units annually.

When the SLR was first announced, Mercedes said total production would be limited to 3,500 units. 1,400 units had been sold by the end of 2007. The factory confirmed that production would halt at the end of 2010.

A total of 2,157 cars were produced.

== Motorsport ==
Spencer Pumpelly entered an SLR McLaren in the Speed World Challenge GT class, driving for TRG Motorsports.

== See also ==
- Mercedes-Benz W196
- Mercedes-Benz 300SL
- Mercedes-Benz 300 SLR
- Mercedes-Benz SLS AMG
