= 2020 Team Bahrain McLaren season =

Team Bahrain McLaren
- 2020 season
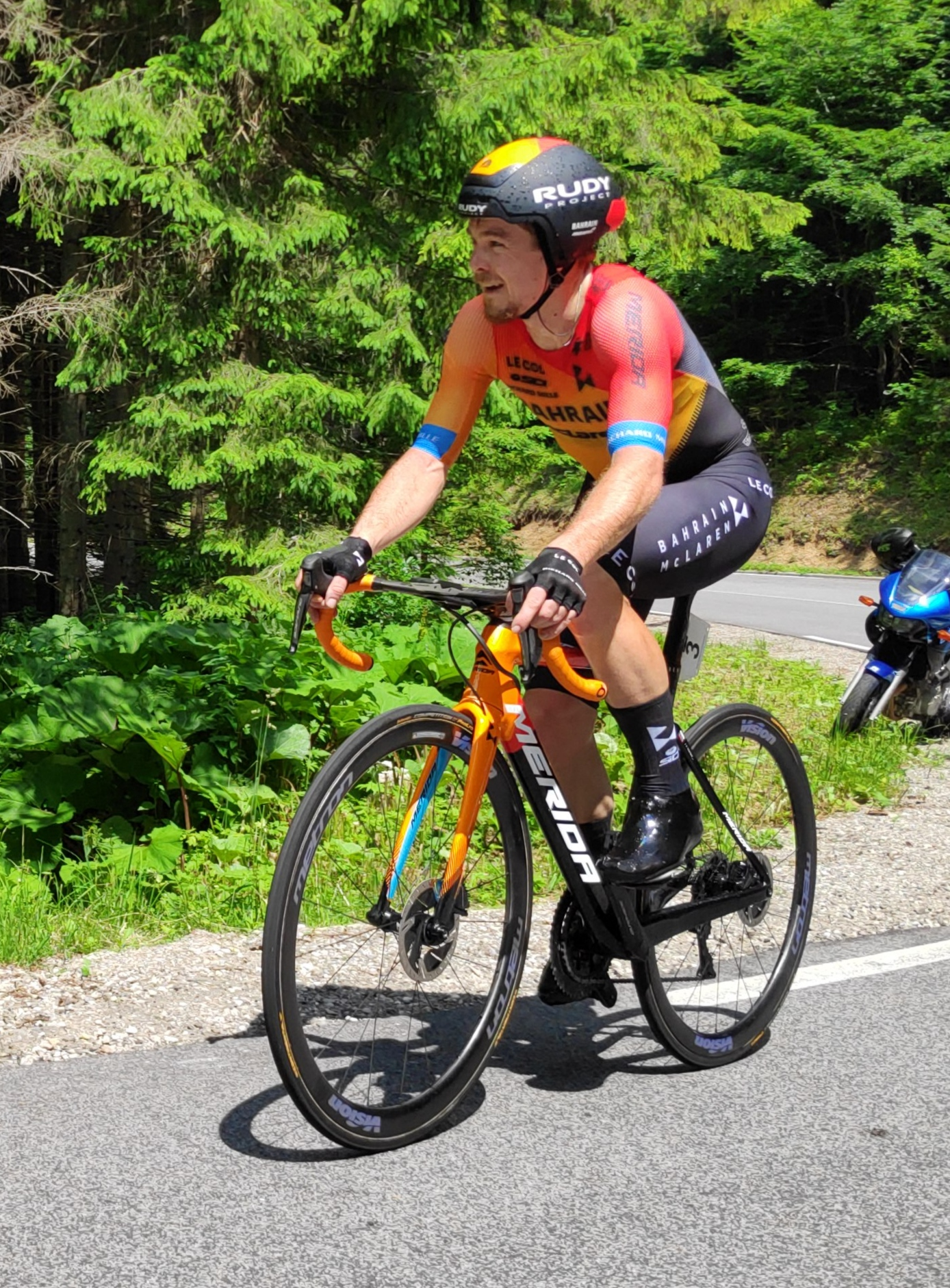
- Tratnik at the 2020 Slovenian National Time Trial Championship
- UCI code: TBM
- Status: UCI WorldTeam
- Manager: Brent Copeland
- Based: Bahrain
- Bicycles: Merida
- Groupset: Shimano

Season victories
- One-day races: 1
- Stage race overall: 1
- Stage race stages: 5
- National Championships: 1
- Most wins: Phil Bauhaus (3)
- Jersey

The 2020 Bahrain McLaren Pro Cycling season is the fourth season of the Bahrain–McLaren team.

== Team roster ==
As of 1 January 2020.

Rider	Date of birth
Yukiya Arashiro (JPN)	22 September 1984 (aged 35)
Phil Bauhaus (GER)	8 July 1994 (aged 25)
Pello Bilbao (ESP)	25 February 1990 (aged 29)
Grega Bole (SLO)	13 August 1985 (aged 34)
Santiago Buitrago (COL)	26 September 1999 (aged 20)
Eros Capecchi (ITA)	13 June 1986 (aged 33)
Damiano Caruso (ITA)	12 October 1987 (aged 32)
Mark Cavendish (GBR)	21 May 1985 (aged 34)
Sonny Colbrelli (ITA)	17 May 1990 (aged 29)
Feng Chun-kai (TWN)	2 November 1988 (aged 31)
Scott Davies (GBR)	5 August 1995 (aged 24)
Iván García Cortina (ESP)	20 November 1995 (aged 24)
Marco Haller (AUT)	1 April 1991 (aged 28)
Heinrich Haussler (AUS)	25 February 1984 (aged 35)

Rider	Date of birth
Kevin Inkelaar (NED)	8 July 1997 (aged 22)
Mikel Landa (ESP)	13 December 1989 (aged 30)
Matej Mohorič (SLO)	19 October 1994 (aged 25)
Domen Novak (SLO)	12 July 1995 (aged 24)
Mark Padun (UKR)	6 July 1996 (aged 23)
Hermann Pernsteiner (AUT)	7 August 1990 (aged 29)
Luka Pibernik (SLO)	23 October 1993 (aged 26)
Wout Poels (NED)	1 October 1987 (aged 32)
Marcel Sieberg (GER)	30 April 1982 (aged 37)
Dylan Teuns (BEL)	1 March 1992 (aged 27)
Jan Tratnik (SLO)	23 February 1990 (aged 29)
Rafael Valls (ESP)	25 June 1987 (aged 32)
Stephen Williams (GBR)	9 June 1996 (aged 23)
Alfred Wright (GBR)	13 June 1999 (aged 20)

Riders who joined the team for the 2020 season

Rider	2019 team
Pello Bilbao	Astana
Santiago Buitrago	Neo-Pro
Eros Capecchi	Deceuninck–Quick-Step
Mark Cavendish	Team Dimension Data
Scott Davies	Team Dimension Data
Marco Haller	Team Katusha–Alpecin
Kevin Inkelaar	Groupama–FDJ Continental Team
Mikel Landa	Movistar Team
Wout Poels	Team Ineos
Rafael Valls	Movistar Team
Alfred Wright	Neo-Pro

Riders who left the team during or after the 2019 season

Rider	2020 team
Valerio Agnoli	
Rohan Dennis	Team Ineos
Andrea Garosio	Vini Zabù–KTM
Kristijan Koren	Suspended
Antonio Nibali	Trek–Segafredo
Vincenzo Nibali	Trek–Segafredo
Domenico Pozzovivo	NTT Pro Cycling
Wang Meiyin	Hengxiang Cycling Team

== Season victories ==
Date	Race	Competition	Rider	Country	Location
6 February	Saudi Tour, Stage 3	UCI Asia Tour	Phil Bauhaus (GER)	Saudi Arabia	Al Bujairi
8 February	Saudi Tour, Stage 5	UCI Asia Tour	Phil Bauhaus (GER)	Saudi Arabia	Al Masnak
8 February	Saudi Tour, Overall	UCI Asia Tour	Phil Bauhaus (GER)	Saudi Arabia	
9 February	Volta a la Comunitat Valenciana, Teams classification	UCI Europe Tour; UCI ProSeries	(Note: The riders in the squad were Pello Bilbao, Scott Davies, Iván García, Kevin Inkelaar, Matej Mohorič, Wout Poels and Dylan Teuns.)	Spain	
23 February	Vuelta a Andalucía, Stage 5	UCI Europe Tour; UCI ProSeries	Dylan Teuns (BEL)	Spain	Mijas
23 February	Vuelta a Andalucía, Teams classification	UCI Europe Tour; UCI ProSeries	(Note: The riders in the squad were Pello Bilbao, Damiano Caruso, Sonny Colbrelli, Mikel Landa, Matej Mohorič, Mark Padun and Dylan Teuns.)	Spain	
1 August	Vuelta a Burgos, Points classification	UCI Europe Tour; UCI ProSeries	Mikel Landa (ESP)	Spain	
2 August	Route d'Occitanie, Stage 2	UCI Europe Tour	Sonny Colbrelli (ITA)	France	Cap Découverte
2 August	Circuito de Getxo	UCI Europe Tour	Damiano Caruso (ITA)	Spain	Getxo
20 October	Giro d'Italia, Stage 16	UCI World Tour	Jan Tratnik (SLO)	Italy	San Daniele del Friuli

== National, Continental and World champions 2020 ==
Date	Discipline	Jersey	Rider	Country	Location
21 August	Spanish National Time Trial Champion		Pello Bilbao (ESP)	Spain	La Iruela
