= Motion Applied =

British technology company

- Formerly: McLaren Applied Technologies; McLaren Applied
- Type: Private
- Founded: 1991 (as McLaren Composites)
- Founder: Ron Dennis
- Headquarters: Dukes Court, Block E Duke Street; Woking; Surrey, United Kingdom
- Key people: Nick Fry (Non-Exec Chairman)
- Products: Electronics and other automotive parts
- Owner: Greybull Capital
- Website: www.motionapplied.com

Motion Applied is a British technology and products company. Capabilities include design, development, manufacture and test of electronic, mechanical, electrical and software products. The company is focused on four industries: motorsport, automotive, transport and mining. The company, founded as McLaren Composites and later known as McLaren Applied, was formerly a part of McLaren Group. Since 2021, it is a fully independent company owned by the private investment firm Greybull Capital.

== History ==
The present company was formed when two McLaren Technology Group companies, McLaren Composites and TAG Electronics, merged due to the sale of Audiolab to International Audio Group. TAG Electronics Holdings was the parent company of TAGMcLaren Audio (Now Audiolab) and also TAG Electronics Systems. When Audiolab was sold, the holding company TAG Electronics Holdings was scrapped and the remaining technology company merged with McLaren Composites, which formed McLaren Applied Technologies.

In September 2014, Ian Rhodes replaced the founder, Ron Dennis, as CEO of the company. The company was initially known as McLaren Composites; its main work being the manufacture of parts for the McLaren F1 and Mercedes SLR. However, it also won contracts to manufacture parts for other companies and moved into the energy industry, mainly solar panels. It was dissolved in 2003 and replaced with McLaren Applied Technologies a short while after in 2004. The company name was changed again on 2 January 2020 to McLaren Applied.

In 2021, McLaren Group sold McLaren Applied to Greybull Capital after financial distress due to the COVID-19 pandemic. The company has seen substantial new investment in its facilities, products and staff under Greybull's ownership. In August 2025, the company announced it was rebranded as Motion Applied.

== Current business activities ==
=== Motorsport ===
In motorsport, Motion Applied is perhaps best known for manufacturing the Standard Electronic Control Unit (SECU) for all F1 teams. Motion Applied have supplied this electronic control unit since 2008, and most recently secured a further extension of this contract to be F1's ECU provider from 2026 - 2030. Motion Applied also supplies software, sensors and other components to multiple Formula One teams.

In addition to Formula One, Motion Applied also provides the engine control units used in the NASCAR Sprint Cup and IndyCar Series. The two ECU's share a common base, and Motion Applied have held the contract for the IndyCar series since 2007 and later 2010 as a standard ECU supplier (previously IndyCar's ECU supplier was Motorola) and NASCAR Cup Series since 2012, which were also switching to fuel injection from carburation, had left an open choice. Motion Applied produced the electric motor, transmission and electronics used in the Spark-Renault SRT 01E, the car used in the inaugural Formula E season.

=== Automotive ===
Motion Applied is a longstanding supplier of automotive grade components. It has specialised in vehicle electrification, particularly inverters. The current fifth generation product, known as IPG5, is based on an 800v Silicon Carbide architecture offering significantly improved efficiency, performance and control fidelity. The product has gained global recognition and secured orders with several car-makers.

=== Communication technology ===
Motion Applied delivers stable connectivity for unstable environments, including public transport and mining through the first 5G edge computing antenna in addition to F1-derived software. It recently launched the Halo300 antenna range.

=== Electric scooters ===
In August 2023, Lavoie, Motion Applied's electric scooter unit, purchased Dutch e-bike manufacturer VanMoof.

== Former business activities ==
McLaren Applied has a history of undertaking pioneering technical projects, often quite different to today's more focussed business. Here are some examples.

In 2010, McLaren Applied developed systems that supported Team GB's 2012 London Olympics medal bids in rowing, sailing and cycling.

McLaren Applied worked with Specialized Bicycle Components to produce the Specialized S-Works+McLaren Venge racing bike, as ridden by Mark Cavendish.

GlaxoSmithKline (GSK) worked with McLaren Applied on developing drugs, vaccines and medication. McLaren Applied also helped develop some household brands of GSK including Aquafresh, Horlicks, Sensodyne, NiQuitin and more. McLaren Applied enabled GSK's toothpaste production line at Maidenhead to cut the time it takes to change over one toothpaste brand or flavour to another from 39 minutes to 15 minutes, resulting in the factory becoming more productive to the tune of 6.7 million tubes of toothpaste a year.

McLaren Applied handled electronics and data for the Ekofisk drilling plant in the North Sea. The McLaren Applied ENERGY website stated: "McLaren Applied has taken its knowledge of analysing large data sets and applied it to drilling. Using real time data direct from the drilling head, the computer models developed by McLaren Applied constantly updates and provides insight that helps guide operational decision making on a day-to-day basis."

McLaren Applied also worked with Wind Turbines companies and data centre companies. McLaren Applied also worked with IO on the design of their data centres and cooling systems for IO.

== Awards ==
The company has won multiple Queen's Awards for Enterprise for innovation and international trade.

McLaren Applied won the Motorsport Industry Association's prestigious 2022 Business Excellence award for Technology & Innovation.

The company won multiple e-mobility awards recognising its contribution to vehicle electrification
