= FAI rent-a-jet =

German charter airline

FAI rent-a-jet GmbH
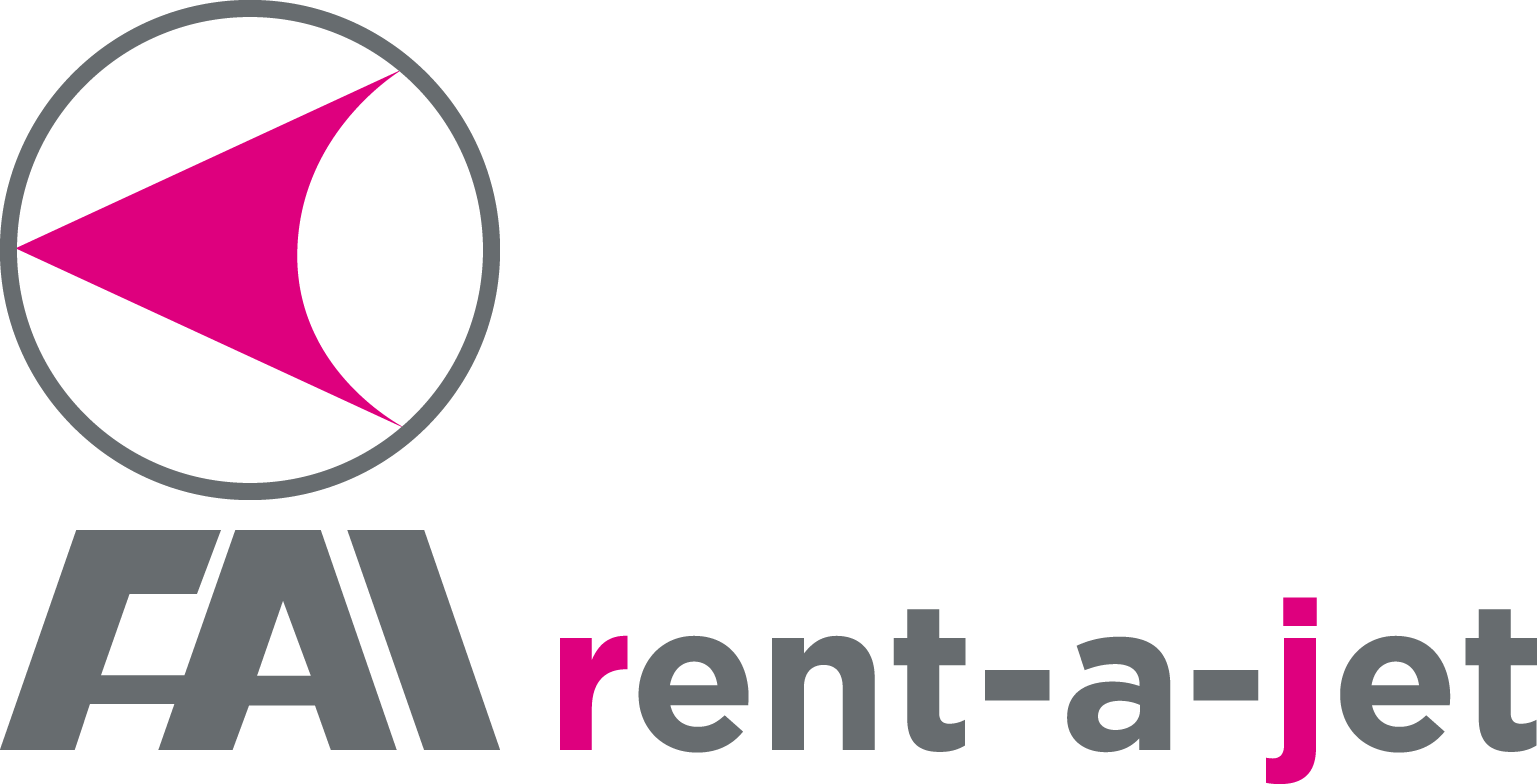
IATA	ICAO	Call sign
F3	IFA	RED ANGEL
- Founded: 1986
- Operating bases: Nuremberg Airport
- Fleet size: 20
- Destinations: Charter & ambulance flights
- Headquarters: Nürnberg, Germany
- Website: fai.ag

FAI rent-a-jet is a German charter airline based in Nuremberg and operating out of Nuremberg Airport.

== History ==
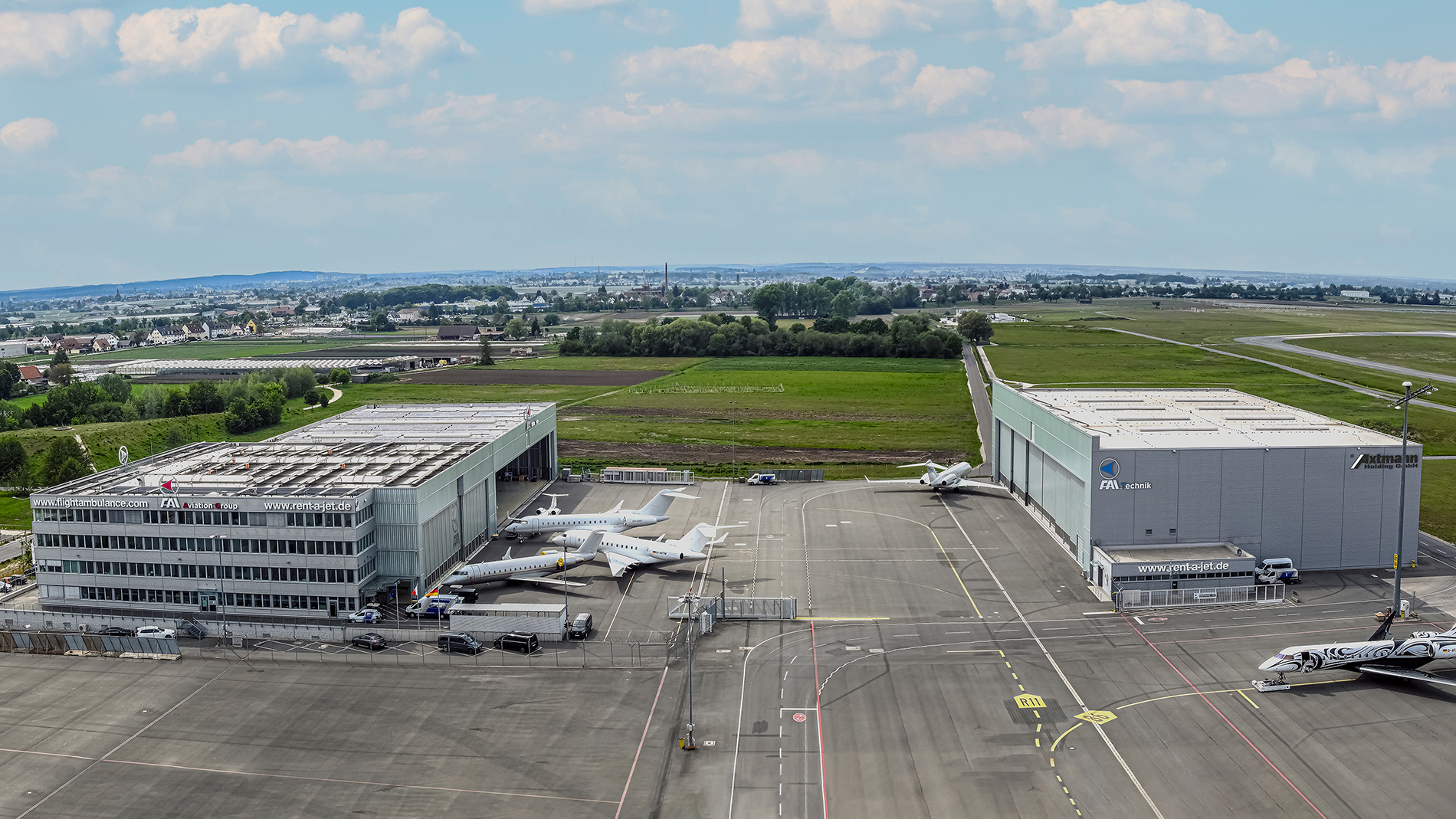
Hangars of FAI Aviation Group at Nuremberg Airport

The FAI was founded in 1986 by Siegfried Axtmann as IFA-Flugbetriebs GmbH, and in 1989 it was renamed as FAI Flight-Ambulance-Service International GmbH & Co. KG, later as FAI rent-a-jet AG after it was sold to Axtmann Holding. The sole shareholder is FAI Aviation Holding GmbH. The headquarters of FAI Aviation Group is located at Albrecht-Dürer International Airport in Nuremberg, Germany. FAI is also an approved provider for ICRC (International Committee of the Red Cross), WFP (World Food Programme), and other global health and aid organizations.

== Business model ==
The FAI Aviation Group is one of the largest providers of private jet charter flights in Europe, and it specializes, according to its own statements, in VIP flights, freight and express courier flights, the transportation of intensive care patients by ambulance jet, logistics support for authorities and non-governmental organizations, as well as aircraft management consulting, leasing, and sales.

The 100% subsidiary FAI Technik GmbH acts as a service provider for aircraft maintenance.

== Fleet ==
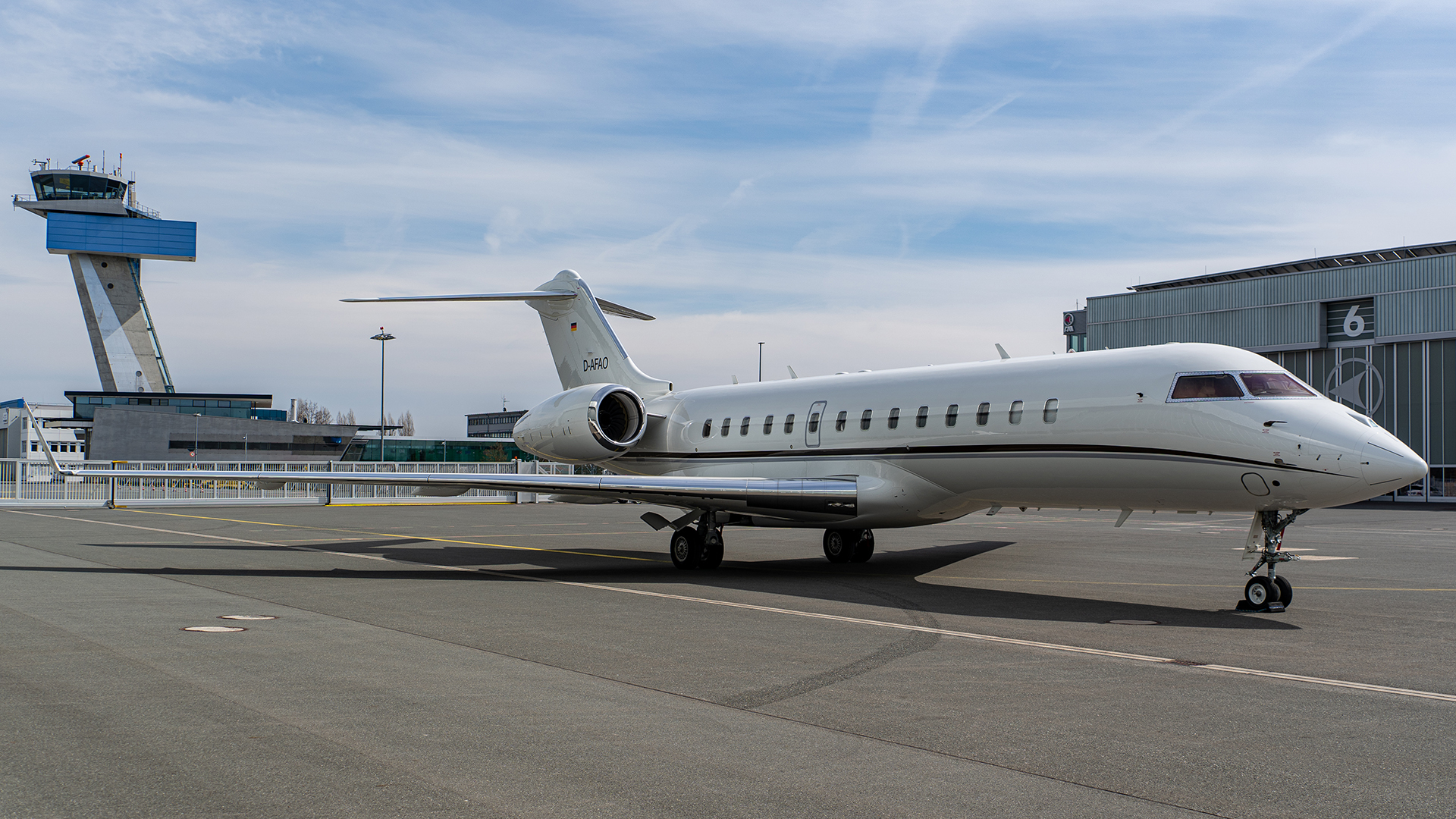
FAI rent-a-jet Bombardier Global Express

FAI rent-a-jet operates Germany’s largest fleet of Bombardier Aircraft which utilised more than 14,000 hours of air time per year. FAI´s fleet of 20 jet aircraft includes five Bombardier Global Express, six Bombardier Challenger 604s, one Challenger 850 and eight Learjet 60 series. FAI runs a 14,000 m^{2} carbon neutral FBO.

Aircraft	In service
Bombardier Challenger 604	6
Bombardier Global Express	4
Learjet 60	5
Total	15
