= Heat spreader =

Device that tends to equalize temperature over its surface

This 120 mm-diameter vapor chamber (heat spreader) heat sink design thermal animation was created using high resolution computational fluid dynamics (CFD) analysis, and shows temperature-contoured heat sink surface and fluid flow trajectories, predicted using a CFD analysis package.

A heat spreader transfers energy as heat from a hotter source to a colder heat sink or heat exchanger. There are two thermodynamic types, passive and active. The most common sort of passive heat spreader is a plate or block of material having high thermal conductivity, such as copper, aluminum, or diamond. An active heat spreader speeds up heat transfer with expenditure of energy as work supplied by an external source.

== Mechanism ==
A heat pipe uses fluids inside a sealed case. The fluids circulate either passively, by spontaneous convection, triggered when a threshold temperature difference occurs; or actively, because of an impeller driven by an external source of work. Without sealed circulation, energy can be carried by transfer of fluid matter, for example externally supplied colder air, driven by an external source of work, from a hotter body to another external body, though this is not exactly heat transfer as defined in physics.

Exemplifying increase of entropy according to the second law of thermodynamics, a passive heat spreader disperses or "spreads out" heat, so that the heat exchanger(s) may be more fully utilized. This has the potential to increase the heat capacity of the total assembly, but the additional thermal junctions limit total thermal capacity. The high conduction properties of the spreader will make it more effective to function as an air heat exchanger, as opposed to the original (presumably smaller) source. The low heat conduction of air in convection is matched by the higher surface area of the spreader, and heat is transferred more effectively.

== Application ==
A heat spreader is generally used when the heat source tends to have a high heat-flux density, (high heat flow per unit area), and for whatever reason, heat can not be conducted away effectively by the heat exchanger. For instance, this may be because it is air-cooled, giving it a lower heat transfer coefficient than if it were liquid-cooled. A high enough heat exchanger transfer coefficient is sufficient to avoid the need for a heat spreader. The use of a heat spreader is an important part of an economically optimal design for transferring heat from high to low heat flux media. Examples include:

- A copper-clad bottom on a steel or stainless steel stove-top cooking container
- Air-cooling integrated circuits such as a microprocessor
- Air-cooling a photovoltaic cell in a concentrated photovoltaics system

Diamond has a very high thermal conductivity. Synthetic diamond is used as submounts for high-power integrated circuits and laser diodes.

Composite materials can be used, such as the metal matrix composites (MMCs) copper–tungsten, AlSiC (silicon carbide in aluminium matrix), Dymalloy (diamond in copper-silver alloy matrix), and E-Material (beryllium oxide in beryllium matrix). Such materials are often used as substrates for chips, as their thermal expansion coefficient can be matched to ceramics and semiconductors.

== Gallery ==
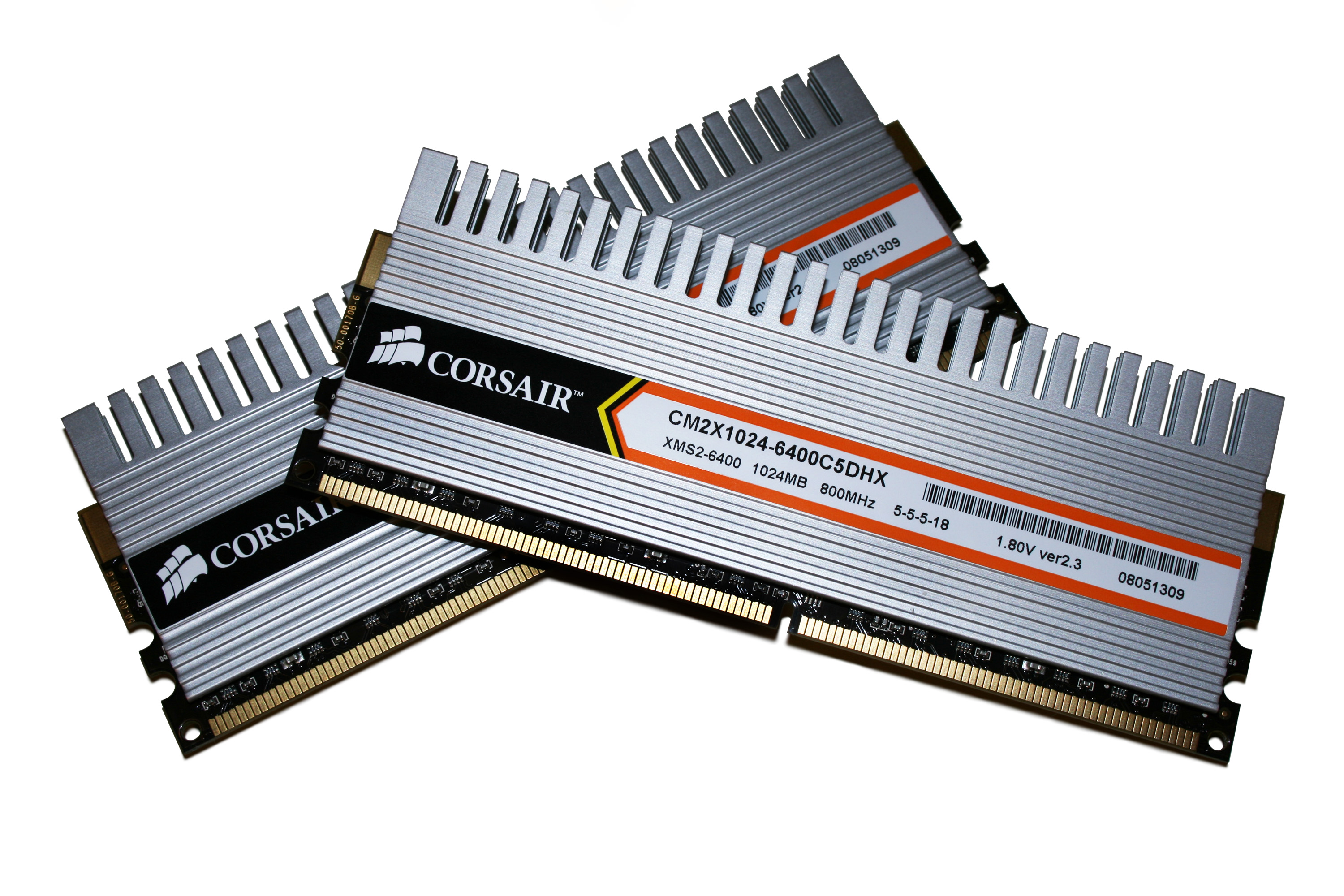
Two memory modules encased in aluminum heat spreaders

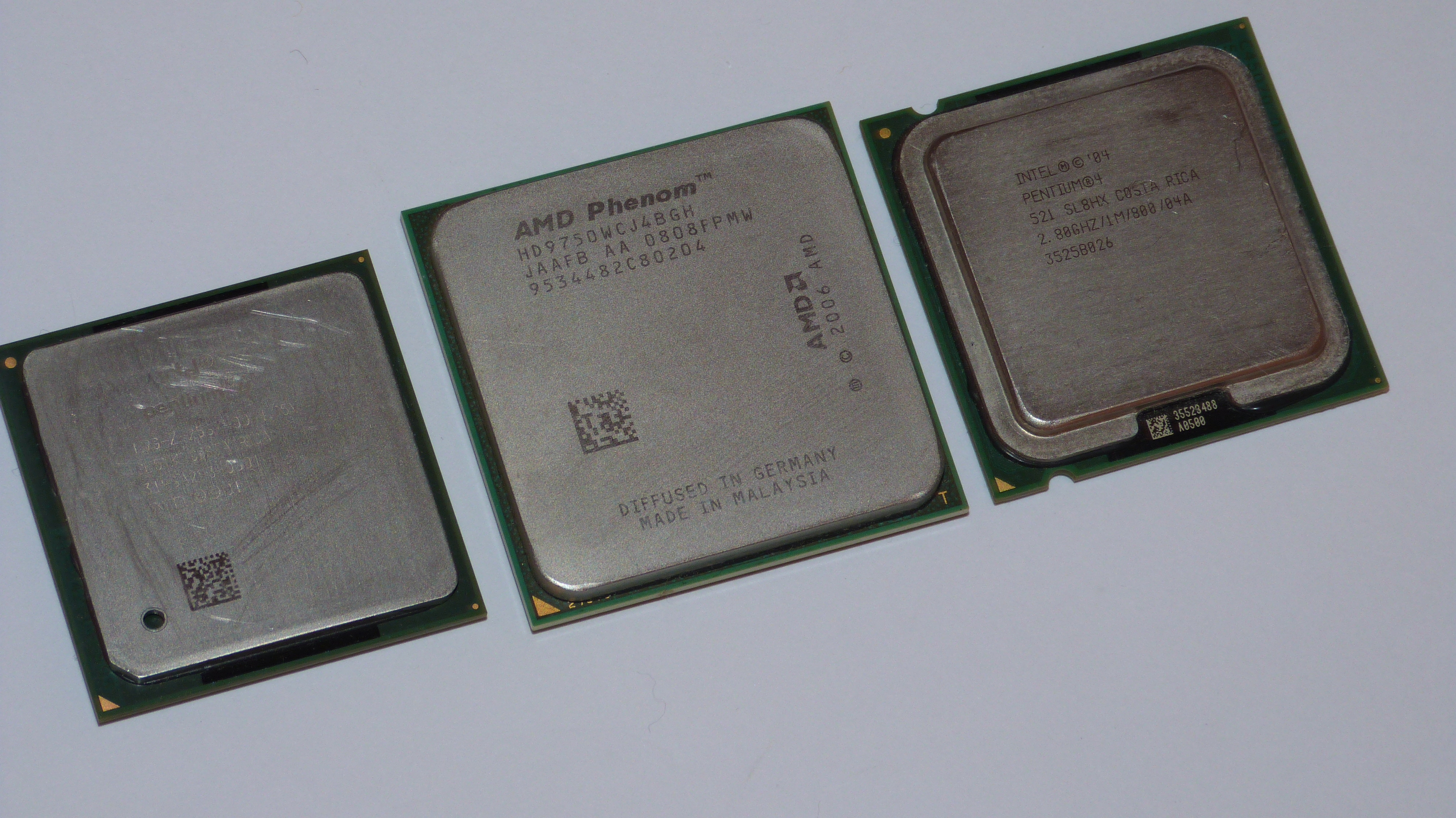
Side-by-side comparison of AMD (center) and Intel (sides) integrated heatspreaders (IHS) common on their microprocessors

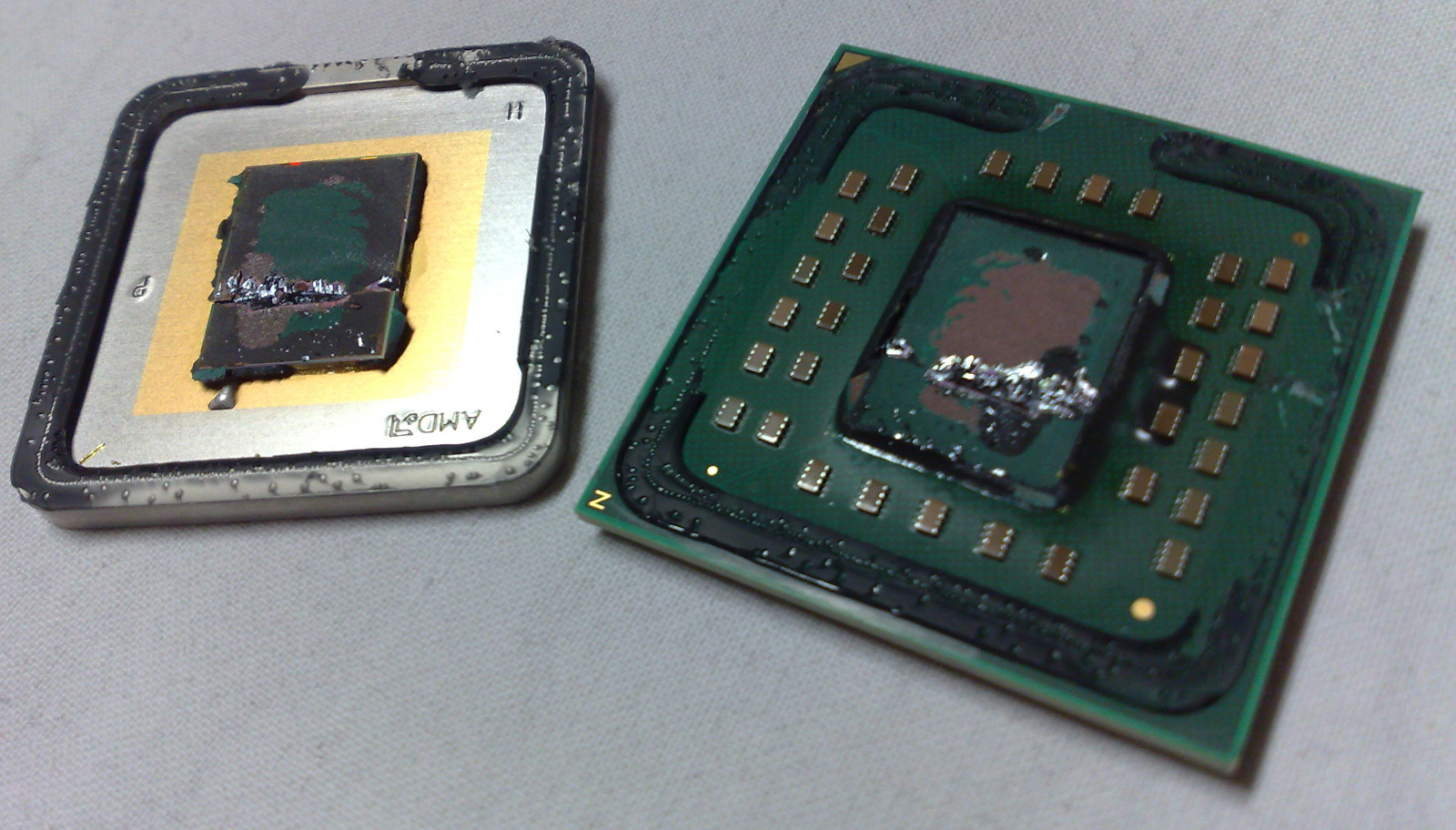
AMD Athlon 64 X2 6000+ (ADA6000IAA6CZ, Windsor), having its heat spreader removed (known as decapping or delidding). This particular CPU core is soldered to the heat spreader, causing the CPU to be destroyed during the removal or making removal more difficult.

== Research ==
In May 2022, researchers at the University of Illinois at Urbana-Champaign and University of California, Berkeley devised a new solution that could cool modern electronics more efficiently than other existing strategies. Their proposed method is based on the use of heat spreaders consisting of an electrical insulating layer of poly (2-chloro-p-xylylene) (Parylene C) and a coating of copper. This solution would also require less expensive materials.

== See also ==
- Computer module
- Thermal grease
- Thermal interface material
