= Advanced composite materials (engineering) =

Materials with unusually strong, elastic fibres bound by weaker matrices

In materials science, advanced composite materials (ACMs) are materials that are generally characterized by unusually high-strength fibres with unusually high stiffness, or modulus of elasticity characteristics, compared to other materials, while bound together by weaker matrices. These are termed "advanced composite materials" in comparison to the composite materials commonly in use such as reinforced concrete, or even concrete itself. The high-strength fibers are also low density while occupying a large fraction of the volume.

Advanced composites exhibit desirable physical and chemical properties that include light weight coupled with high stiffness (elasticity), and strength along the direction of the reinforcing fiber, dimensional stability, temperature and chemical resistance, flex performance, and relatively easy processing. Advanced composites are replacing metal components in many uses, particularly in the aerospace industry.

Composites are classified according to their matrix phases. These classifications are polymer matrix composites (PMCs), ceramic matrix composites (CMCs), and metal matrix composites (MMCs). Also, materials within these categories are often called "advanced" if they combine the properties of high (axial, longitudinal) strength values and high (axial, longitudinal) stiffness values, with low weight, corrosion resistance, and in some cases special electrical properties.

Advanced composite materials have broad, proven applications, in the aircraft, aerospace, and sports-equipment sectors. Even more specifically, ACMs are very attractive for aircraft and aerospace structural parts. ACMs have been developed for NASA's Advanced Space Transportation Program, armor protection for Army aviation and the Federal Aviation Administration of the USA, and high-temperature shafting for the Comanche helicopter. Additionally, ACMs have a decades-long history in military and government aerospace industries. However, much of the technology is new and not presented formally in secondary or undergraduate education, and the technology of advanced composites manufacture is continually evolving.

== Overview and historical perspective ==
Manufacturing ACMs is a multibillion-dollar industry worldwide. Composite products range from skateboards to components of the Space Shuttle. The industry can be generally divided into two basic segments: industrial composites and advanced composites. Several of the composites-manufacturing processes are common to both segments. The two basic segments are described below.

=== Industrial composites ===
The industrial-composites industry has been in place for over 40 years in the U.S. This large industry uses various resin systems including polyester, epoxy, and other specialty resins. These materials, along with a catalyst or curing agent and some type of fiber reinforcement (typically glass fibers), are used in the production of a wide spectrum of industrial components and consumer goods: boats, piping, auto bodies, and other parts and components.

=== Advanced composites ===
The advanced-composites industry is characterized by the use of expensive, high-performance resin systems and high-strength, high-stiffness fiber reinforcement. The aerospace industry, including military and commercial aircraft of all types, is the major customer for advanced composites. These materials have also been adopted for use by the sporting-goods suppliers who sell high-performance equipment to the golf, tennis, fishing, and archery markets; as well as in the swimming pool industry with composite wall structures.

While aerospace is the predominant market for advanced composites today, the industrial and automotive markets will increasingly see the use of advanced composites toward the year 2000. At present, both manual and automated processes are employed in making advanced-composite parts. As automated processes become more predominant, the costs of advanced composites are expected to decline to the point at which these materials will be used widely in electronic, machinery, and surface-transportation equipment.

Suppliers of advanced composite materials tend to be larger companies capable of doing the research and development necessary to provide the high-performance resin systems used in this segment of the industry. End-users also tend to be large, and many are in the aerospace businesses.

== Limitations ==
Despite their strength and low weight, composites have not been a miracle solution for aircraft structures. Composites are typically difficult to inspect for flaws. Some of them absorb moisture. Most importantly, they can be prohibitively expensive, primarily because they are labor-intensive and often require complex and expensive fabrication machines. Aluminium, by contrast, is easy and inexpensive to manufacture and repair; for example, in a minor collision, an aluminium component can often be hammered back into its original shape, whereas a crunched fiberglass component will likely have to be completely replaced.

Aluminium has a relatively high fracture toughness, allowing it to undergo large amounts of plastic deformation before failure. Composites, on the other hand, are less damage-tolerant and undergo much less plastic deformation before failure. An airplane made entirely from aluminium can be repaired almost anywhere. This is not the case for composite materials, particularly as they use different and more exotic materials. Because of this, composites will probably always be used more in military aircraft, which are constantly being maintained, than in commercial aircraft, which have to require less maintenance. Aluminium still remains a remarkably useful material for aircraft structures, and metallurgists have worked hard to develop better aluminium alloys, such as aluminium-lithium alloys.

== See also ==
- Composite material
- NASA Advanced Space Transportation Program
