= E-Material =

E-Material, also called E Material, is a metal matrix composite consisting of beryllium matrix with beryllium oxide particles. It has high thermal conductivity (210-230 W/m K), and its thermal expansion can be adjusted to match other materials, e.g. silicon and gallium arsenide chips and various ceramics. It is chiefly used in microelectronics as substrate for power semiconductor devices and high density multi-chip modules, where it aids with removal of waste heat. E-materials have low weight and high strength, making them especially suitable for aerospace technology. Their high elastic modulus is favorable for absorbing vibrations and lowering material fatigue of attached modules and wire bonds.

Several variants exist:

- E-20, containing 80 vol.% of beryllium and 20 vol.% (25.8-32.25 w.%) beryllium oxide. Its thermal conductivity is 210 W/(m·K). Its thermal expansion coefficient is 8.7. Its density at 25 °C is 2.045 g/cm^{3}.
- E-40, containing 60 vol.% of beryllium and 40 vol.% (49.5-54.8 w.%) beryllium oxide. Its thermal conductivity is 220 W/(m·K). Its thermal expansion coefficient is 7.5. Its density at 25 °C is 2.277 g/cm^{3}.
- E-60, containing 40 vol.% of beryllium and 60 vol.% (69.4-73.2 w.%) beryllium oxide. Its thermal conductivity is 230 W/(m·K). Its thermal expansion coefficient is 6.1. Its density at 25 °C is 2.513 g/cm^{3}.

E-materials are prepared by impact grinding and then hot isostatic pressing into a block. The block is then sliced to cards, sawn to required shape, polished, machined, and optionally plated with e.g. nickel, cadmium, chrome, silver, copper, or gold. Without coatings, the corrosion resistance of E-materials is similar to aluminium.

E-materials are used in aerospace technology, e.g. as laminated multi-chip modules in Iridium and Globalstar satellites, as heat sinks, and in avionics of F-22 Raptor, F-16 Fighting Falcon, F/A-18 Hornet, and the Joint Strike Fighter. It is also used in SEM-E modules and printed wiring boards.

Care has to be taken during machining and handling of E-materials, as beryllium and its compounds are toxic.

Gold-tin and gold-germanium alloys can be used for brazing with kovar or CuMo and other electronics packaging alloys.

A similar material is Dymalloy, with copper-silver alloy instead of beryllium and diamond instead of beryllium oxide, or AlSiC, aluminium with silicon carbide. Other materials are copper reinforced with carbon fiber, diamond-reinforced aluminium, reinforced carbon-carbon, and pyrolytic graphite.

Another similar material is AlBeMet®, a metal-matrix composite of aluminium and beryllium.
