= Titanium powder =

Powder made of titanium metal

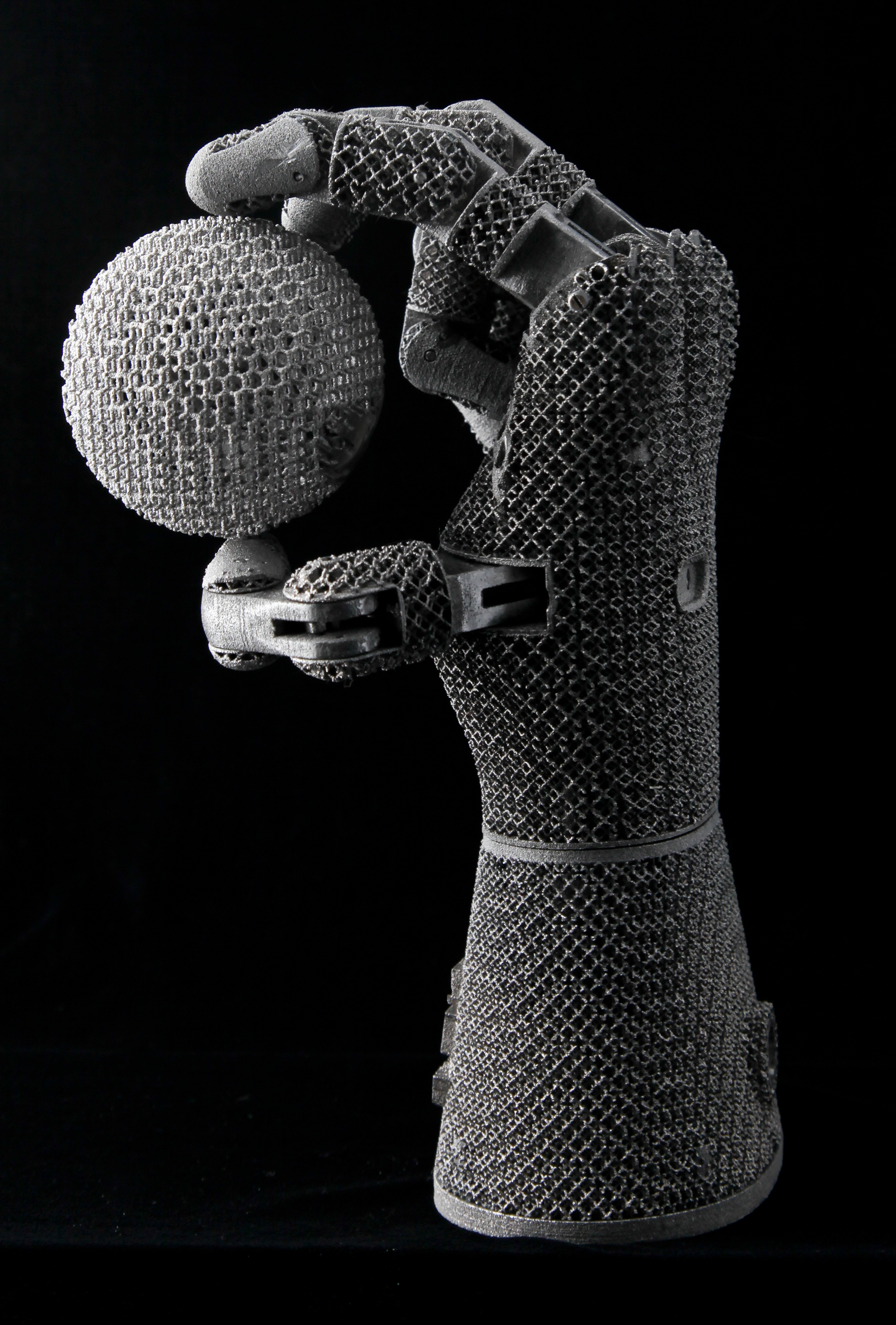
Robotic hand and ball made from titanium powder

Titanium powder metallurgy offers the possibility of creating net-shape or near-net-shape parts without the material loss and cost associated with having to machine intricate components from wrought billet. Powders can be produced by the blended elemental technique or by pre-alloying and then consolidation by metal injection moulding, hot isostatic pressing, direct powder rolling, or laser-engineered net shaping.

Titanium powder is used in aerospace, medical implants, 3D printing, powder metallurgy, and surface coatings due to its strength, low weight, and corrosion resistance. It also plays a vital role in energy generation, in sports equipment, and as a catalyst in chemical processes.

== Blended elemental technique ==
The traditional technique of titanium production is via the Kroll process, which involves chlorination of TiO_{2} ore in the presence of carbon and reacting the resulting TiCl_{4} with magnesium to produce titanium sponge. These processes take place at temperatures as high as 1040 °C. The sponge particles range in size from 45 to 180 μm, with particles ~150 μm termed "sponge fines". These fines are irregularly shaped and porous with a sponge-like morphology. The fines are then blended with alloy additions, cold-compacted into a green compact at up to 415 MPa, then vacuum-sintered at 1260 °C to produce a 99.5% dense component. Hot isostatic pressing (HIP) can further increase the density of these parts and produce components more economically than cast or wrought parts, but the porosity present in the material degrades fatigue and fracture properties. The blended-elemental approach has been used to produce valves for the Toyota Altezza, golf-club heads, and softball bats. More recently, close-to-100% dense Ti Grade 5 parts have been achieved using a hydrided powder along with 60:40 Al:V master alloy. The mechanical properties compare well with those exhibited by cast-and-wrought products. A cost estimate of less than $3.00 for a 0.320-gram automotive connection link has been made.

== Pre-alloyed powder production ==
Several techniques exist to produce pre-alloyed powder, such as Grade 5. In the hydride-dehydride process, feedstock such as solid scrap, billet, or machined turnings are processed to remove contaminants, hydrogenated to produce brittle material, then ground under argon in a vibratory ball mill, typically at 400 °C for 4 hours at a pressure of 1 psi for Ti Grade 5. The resulting particles are angular and measure between 50 and 300 μm. Cold compaction after dehydrogenation of the powder, followed by either vacuum hot pressing (in this case the dehydrogenation process can be bypassed as hydrogen is removed under vacuum) or HIP and a final vacuum anneal, produces powders with hydrogen below 125 ppm. The possible presence of contaminants makes these powders unsuitable for use in critical aircraft applications.

In the plasma rotating electrode process (PREP), the feedstock, such as Ti Grade 5, is in the form of a rotating bar which is arced with gas plasma. The molten metal is centrifugally flung off the bar, cools down, and is collected. The powders produced are spherical, between 100 and 300 μm in size, with good packing and flow characteristics, making the powder ideal for high-quality, near-net-shape parts produced by HIP, such as aviation parts and porous coatings on hip prostheses.

In the titanium gas atomisation (TGA) process, titanium is vacuum-induction-skull melted in a water-cooled copper crucible, the metal tapped, and the molten metal stream atomized with a stream of high-pressure inert gas. The tiny droplets are spherical and measure between 50 and 350 μm. The TGA process has been used to produce a wide variety of materials, such as commercially pure titanium, conventional alpha-beta, and beta alloys.

In plasma atomization (PA) process, a titanium wire is atomized by 3 inert-gas plasma jets to form spherical metal powders. The distribution of diameter obtained in the PA process ranges from 0 to 200 μm, and the powders obtained are very pure. The PA process specializes in the production of high-melting-point material as titanium (CP-Ti, Ti-6Al-4V), niobium, molybdenum, tantalum, and many more.

=== Electrode induction-melting gas atomization ===
In the electrode induction-melting gas atomization (EIGA) process, a pre-alloyed titanium electrode bar is slowly rotated and fed through an induction coil, where the tip is melted without contacting any crucible material. The molten metal drips directly into a high-pressure inert gas stream (argon or helium), producing highly spherical powder typically in the 20–150 μm range. Because no ceramic crucible is used, EIGA minimises the oxygen pickup that can occur when reactive titanium alloys contact refractory materials during conventional gas atomisation.

== Powder consolidation ==
Several metal-consolidation techniques are used to produce the final product. Metal injection moulding (MIM), otherwise known as powder injection moulding, is a well-established and cost-effective method of fabricating small-to-moderate-size metal components in large quantities. It is derived from plastic injection moulding, whereby mixing of a metal powder with a polymer binder forms the feedstock, which is then injected into a mould, after which the binder is removed via heat treatment under vacuum before final sintering. With titanium, however, the binders used in MIM result in the introduction of carbon into the matrix due to insufficient binder removal prior to sintering, or deleterious reactions between the decomposing binder, the debinding atmosphere, and the metal phase. This results in titanium parts with mechanical properties unsuited to critical aerospace applications, but suitable for parts where tensile and impact properties are less important. Recently, work has been carried out to reduce the binder to < 8% volume fraction, resulting in the complete removal of the binder from the moulded component during heat treatment.

In the direct powder rolling (DPR) process, BE powder is used to produce sheet, plate, and composite multilayered sheet and plates. Sheets between 1.27 and 2.54 mm and 50 to 99+% dense of single layer CP titanium, Ti Grade 5, TiAl (Ti-48Al-2Cr-2Nb), and composite Ti/Grade 5/Ti and Grade 5/TiAl/Grade 5 have been produced by DPR and sintering.

Laser engineered net shaping (LENS) is an additive manufacturing technique for rapidly fabricating, enhancing, and repairing metal components directly from CAD data. The processes use a high-power solid-state laser focused onto a metal substrate to create a ~1 mm diameter melt pool. Metal powder is then injected into the melt pool to increase the material volume and build up the component layer by layer. Experimental gas thrusters (build time 8 hours) and automotive brackets have been manufactured in Ti-Grade 5. Selective laser sintering (SLS) is similar, except that the laser selectively fuses powdered material by scanning on the surface of a powder bed. After each cross-section is scanned, the powder bed is lowered by one layer thickness, a new layer of material is applied on top, and the process is repeated until the part is completed.

In hot isostatic pressing, high temperature and pressure are used to consolidate powders to close to their maximum theoretical densities.

Electric-current-assisted sintering, also known as spark plasma sintering (SPS), relies on fast application of resistive heating and pressure to consolidate powders close to their maximum theoretical densities, without the undesired grain-growth effect, thereby retaining close-to-original grain size and achieving improved mechanical properties in the final product. Oxygen content is a critical quality parameter for titanium powder, since interstitial oxygen strengthens the metal but causes embrittlement above specification limits; control of oxygen pickup during powder production, handling, and consolidation is therefore essential. In metal injection molding (MIM) of titanium, oxygen is introduced at the powder feedstock, debinding, and sintering stages, and the total pickup must be limited to retain ductility in the sintered part.

== Emerging technologies ==
Work is progressing on bypassing the conventional route of atomising wrought feedstock or sponge and the inherent cost associated with the traditional Kroll process. Several of these processes, such as the FFC, MER Corporation, OS, Ginatta, and BHP Billiton processes, rely on the electrolytic reduction of TiO_{2} (a cheap and abundant material) to form titanium metal. So far, no material from these processes has been sold commercially on the open market, and cost models have yet to be published, but they offer the possibility of inexpensive titanium powder in the near future. The countries that have such facilities to generate titanium sponge are Saudi Arabia, China, Japan, Russia, Kazakhstan, the USA, Ukraine, and India. The Titanium Sponge Plant in India is the only one in the world that can undertake all the different activities of manufacturing aerospace-grade titanium sponge under one roof.

== Environmental impact ==
A prospective life cycle assessment of titanium powder atomization technologies, projecting EIGA and plasma rotating electrode process (PREP) to 2035, found that future EIGA is expected to consume approximately 50% less electricity and 98% less argon than future PREP for the production of Ti-6Al-4V powder. Both technologies are projected to achieve significant reductions in environmental impact compared to current atomization practices, driven by anticipated improvements in reactor design, argon recovery, and energy efficiency.

== Powder reuse and recycling ==
In powder bed fusion, a large fraction of the powder bed is not melted in each build and can be recovered for reuse, making powder recycling a significant factor in the cost and sustainability of titanium additive manufacturing. Recycled Ti-6Al-4V powder gradually accumulates oxygen, loses some of its fine fraction, and shows reduced flowability with repeated build cycles, so reuse strategies must account for the powder's full history. Studies of Ti-6Al-4V recycling in laser powder bed fusion have shown that controlled reuse, with appropriate sieving and blending of recovered powder with virgin powder, can maintain acceptable mechanical properties while reducing material waste and cost.
