= Copper–tungsten =

Mixture of copper and tungsten

Copper–tungsten (tungsten–copper, CuW, or WCu) is a mixture of copper and tungsten. As copper and tungsten are not mutually soluble, the material is composed of distinct particles of one metal dispersed in a matrix of the other one. The microstructure is therefore rather a metal matrix composite instead of a true alloy.

The material combines the properties of both metals, resulting in a material that is heat-resistant, ablation-resistant, highly thermally and electrically conductive, and easy to machine.

Parts are made from the CuW composite by pressing the tungsten particles into the desired shape, sintering the compacted part, then infiltrating with molten copper. Sheets, rods, and bars of the composite mixture are available as well.

Commonly used copper tungsten mixtures contains 10–50 wt.% of copper, the remaining portion being mostly tungsten. The typical properties is dependent on its composition. The mixture with less wt.% of copper has higher density, higher hardness, and higher resistivity. The typical density of CuW90, with 10% of copper, is 16.75 g/cm^{3} and 11.85 g/cm^{3} for CuW50 . CuW90 has higher hardness and resistivity of 260 HB kgf/mm^{2} and 6.5 μΩ.cm than CuW50.

Typical properties of commonly used copper tungsten compositions

Composition	Density	Hardness	Resistivity	Conductivity	Bending strength
wt. %	g/cm^{3}≥	HB Kgf/mm^{2}≥	μΩ.cm≤	%IACS≥	Mpa≥
W50/Cu50	11.85	115	3.2	54	–
W55/Cu45	12.30	125	3.5	49	–
W60/Cu40	12.75	140	3.7	47	–
W65/Cu35	13.30	155	3.9	44	–
W70/Cu30	13.80	175	4.1	42	790
W75/Cu25	14.50	195	4.5	38	885
W80/Cu20	15.15	220	5.0	34	980
W85/Cu15	15.90	240	5.7	30	1080
W90/Cu10	16.75	260	6.5	27	1160

== Applications ==
CuW composites are used where the combination of high heat resistance, high electrical and thermal conductivity, and low thermal expansion are needed. Some of the applications are in electric resistance welding, as electrical contacts, and as heat sinks. As contact material, the composite is resistant to erosion by electric arc. WCu alloys are also used in electrodes for electrical discharge machining and electrochemical machining.

The CuW75 composite, with 75% tungsten, is widely used in chip carriers, substrates, flanges, and frames for power semiconductor devices. The high thermal conductivity of copper together with the low thermal expansion of tungsten allows thermal expansion matching to silicon, gallium arsenide, and some ceramics. Other materials for this applications are copper-molybdenum alloy, AlSiC, and Dymalloy.

Composites with 70–90% of tungsten are used in liners of some specialty shaped charges. The penetration is enhanced by factor 1.3 against copper for homogeneous steel target, as both the density and the break-up time are increased. Tungsten powder based shaped charge liners are especially suitable for oil well completion. Other ductile metals can be used as a binder in place of copper as well. Graphite can be added as lubricant to the powder.

CuW can also be used as a contact material in a vacuum. When the contact is very fine grained (VFG), the electrical conductivity is much higher than a normal piece of copper tungsten. Copper tungsten is a good choice for a vacuum contact due to its low cost, resistance to arc erosion, good conductivity, and resistance to mechanical wear and contact welding. CuW is usually a contact for vacuum, oil, and gas systems. It is not a good contact for air since the surface will oxidize when exposed. CuW is less likely to erode in air when the concentration of copper is higher in the material. The uses of CuW in the air are as an arc tip, arc plate, and an arc runner.

Copper tungsten materials are often used for arcing contacts in medium to high voltage sulfur hexafluoride (SF_{6}) circuit breakers in environments that can reach temperatures above 20,000K. The copper tungsten material's resistance to arc erosion can be increased by modifying the grain size and chemical composition.

The Spark Erosion (EDM) process calls for copper tungsten. Usually, this process is used with graphite, but as tungsten has a high melting point (3420 °C) this allows the CuW electrodes to have a longer service life than the graphite electrodes. This is crucial when the electrodes have been processed with complex machining. Since the electrodes are susceptible to wear the electrodes provide more geometrical accuracy than the other electrodes. These properties also let the rods and tubes manufactured for spark erosion be made smaller in diameter and have a longer length since the material is less likely to chip and warp.

== Properties ==
Tungsten wt. %	55	68	70	75	78	80	85	90
UTS (MPa)	434	517	586	620	648	662	517	483
Thermal Conductivity (W/(cm K))	2.4	2.1	2.01	1.89	1.84	1.82	1.75	1.47
Electro Resistance at 20 °C	3.16	3.33	3.41	3.51	3.71	3.9	4.71	6.1
Specific Heat Capacity at 100C						195	174	160

The electrical and thermal properties of the composites vary with different proportions. An increase in copper increases the thermal conductivity, which plays a huge part when being used in circuit breakers. Electrical resistivity increases with an increase in the percentage of tungsten present in the composite, ranging from 3.16 at 55% tungsten to 6.1 when the composite contains 90% tungsten. An increase in tungsten leads to an increase in ultimate tensile strength up until the alloy reaches 80% tungsten and 20% copper with an ultimate tensile strength of 663 MPa. After this mixture of copper and tungsten, the ultimate tensile strength then begins to decrease fairly rapidly.
