= Lanxide process =

Metal production process

The Lanxide process, also known as pressureless metal infiltration, is a way of producing metal-matrix composite materials by a process of partial reaction; the process involves a careful choice of initial alloy (usually aluminium with about 3% magnesium and about 10% silicon), and then the maintenance of conditions in which the polycrystalline reaction product has a mechanical composition such that metal is drawn up through it towards the oxidiser by capillary action, so the composite material grows downwards.

The process can be used for near-net-shape casting, including in protocols where the final casting has a cavity in the shape of the casting pattern - in that case, the metal is poured into the cavity, which has been arranged to lie in the middle of a quantity of "filler" corresponding to the reaction product, and wicks itself to fill the pores in the filler.

The normal application is to produce alumina-reinforced aluminium; the process also allows the growth of ceramic layers inside metal encasements, providing pre-stressing.

Lanxide metal-matrix composite materials were used for brake disks in the original models of the Lotus Elise sports car but they turned out to be uneconomic.
