= AlSiC =

Metal matrix composite

AlSiC, pronounced "alsick", is a metal matrix composite consisting of aluminium matrix with silicon carbide particles. It has high thermal conductivity (180–200 W/m K), and its thermal expansion can be adjusted to match other materials, e.g. silicon and gallium arsenide chips and various ceramics. It is chiefly used in microelectronics as substrate for power semiconductor devices and high density multi-chip modules, where it aids with removal of waste heat.

Several variants exist:

- AlSiC-9, containing 37 vol.% of A 356.2 aluminium alloy and 63 vol.% silicon carbide. Its thermal conductivity is 190–200 W/m K. Its thermal expansion roughly matches gallium arsenide, silicon, indium phosphide, alumina, aluminium nitride, silicon nitride, and Direct Bonded Copper aluminium nitride. It is also compatible with some low temperature co-fired ceramics, e.g. Ferro A6M and A6S, Heraeus CT 2000, and Kyocera GL560. Its density at 25 °C is 3.01 g/cm^{3}.
- AlSiC-10, containing 45 vol.% of A 356.2 aluminium alloy and 55 vol.% silicon carbide. Its thermal conductivity is 190–200 W/m K. Its thermal expansion roughly matches e.g. printed circuit boards, FR-4, and Duroid. Its density at 25 °C is 2.96 g/cm^{3}.
- AlSiC-12, containing 63 vol.% of A 356.2 aluminium alloy and 37 vol.% silicon carbide. Its thermal conductivity is 170–180 W/m K. It is compatible with generally the same materials as AlSiC-10. Its density at 25 °C is 2.89 g/cm^{3}.

AlSiC composites are suitable replacements for copper-molybdenum (CuMo) and copper-tungsten (CuW) alloys; they have about 1/3 the weight of copper, 1/5 of CuMo, and 1/6 of CuW, making them suitable for weight-sensitive applications; they are also stronger and stiffer than copper. They can be used as heatsinks, substrates for power electronics (e.g. IGBTs and high-power LEDs), heat spreaders, housings for electronics, and lids for chips, e.g. microprocessors and ASICs. Metal and ceramic inserts and channels for a coolant can be integrated into the parts during manufacture. AlSiC composites can be produced relatively inexpensively (USD 2-4/lb in large series); the dedicated tooling however causes large up-front expenses, making AlSiC more suitable for mature designs. Heat pipes can be embedded into AlSiC, raising effective heat conductivity to 500–800 W/m K.

AlSiC parts are typically manufactured by near net shape approach, by creating a SiC preform by metal injection molding of an SiC-binder slurry, firing to remove the binder, then infiltration under pressure with molten aluminium. Parts can be made with sufficient tolerance to not require further machining. The material is fully dense, without voids, and is hermetic. Its high stiffness and low density suits larger parts with thin walls such as fins for heat dissipation. AlSiC can be plated with nickel and nickel-gold, or by other metals by thermal spraying. Ceramic and metal insets can be inserted into the preform before aluminium infiltration, resulting in a hermetic seal. AlSiC can be also prepared by mechanical alloying. When lower degree of SiC content is used, parts can be stamped from AlSiC sheets.

The aluminium matrix contains high amount of dislocations, responsible for the strength of the material. The dislocations are introduced during cooling by the SiC particles, due to their different thermal expansion coefficient.

A similar material is Dymalloy, with copper-silver alloy instead of aluminium and diamond instead of silicon carbide. Other materials are copper reinforced with carbon fiber, diamond-reinforced aluminium, reinforced carbon-carbon, and pyrolytic graphite.
