= NASA Advanced Space Transportation Program =

The Advanced Space Transportation Program (ASTP) is a NASA program to intentionally advance current space transportation system technologies, and innovate novel technologies, through intense research efforts that are intended to culminate in regularizing the outer space environment decades from now. The intense efforts aim to accelerate scientific and technological breakthroughs.

== Routine space travel ==
As NASA's core technology program for all space transportation, the Advanced Space Transportation Program at the Marshall Space Flight Center is advancing technologies that substantially increase the safety, and reliability of space transportation, as well as reduce the cost. Presently, it costs $10,000 to put a pound of payload in Earth orbit. NASA's goal is to reduce the cost of getting to space to hundreds of dollars per pound within 25 years and tens of dollars per pound within 40 years.

The high cost of space transportation coupled with unreliability currently discourages access to space as an everyday environment. When space transportation becomes safe and affordable for ordinary people numerous possibilities and opportunities can be envisioned. The vision is guided by possibilities such as living and working in space, exploring new worlds, and vacationing off the Earth. In a similar context opportunities for business and pleasure are added multiples.

Additionally, researchers at the Marshall Space Flight Center are intentionally advancing technologies from simple engines to exotic drives in order to fulfil each of the above objectives.

=== New-generation launch vehicles ===
The program's primary emphasis is on technologies for third generation reusable launch vehicles (RLVs) within an operational time frame of the year 2025, lowering the price tag to $100 per pound. As the next step beyond NASA's X-33 and X-34 flight demonstrators, these advanced technologies would move space transportation closer to an airline style of operations with horizontal takeoffs and landings, quick turnaround times and small ground support crews.

Third generation launch vehicles — beyond the Space Shuttle and "X" planes — are intended to use various cutting-edge technologies, such as advanced propellants that pack more energy into smaller tanks and result in smaller launch vehicles. Advanced thermal protection systems also will be necessary for future launch vehicles because they will fly faster through the atmosphere, resulting in higher structural heating than today's vehicles.

Another emerging technology – intelligent vehicle health management systems – could allow the launch vehicle to determine its own health without human inspection. Sensors embedded in the vehicle could send signals to determine if any damage occurs during flight. Upon landing, the vehicle's on-board computer could download the vehicle's health status to a ground controller's laptop computer, recommend specific maintenance points or tell the launch site it's ready for the next launch.

=== Oxygen-air-breathing propulsion ===
The Advanced Space Transportation Program is developing technologies for air-breathing rocket engines that could help make future space transportation like today's air travel. In late 1996, the Marshall Center began testing these radical rocket engines. Powered by engines that "breathe" oxygen from the air, the spacecraft would be completely reusable, take off and land at airport runways, and be ready to fly again within days.

An air-breathing engine – or rocket-based, combined cycle engine – gets its initial take-off power from specially designed rockets, called air-augmented rockets, that boost performance about 15 percent over conventional rockets. When the vehicle's velocity reaches twice the speed of sound, the rockets are turned off and the engine relies totally on oxygen in the atmosphere to burn the fuel. Once the vehicle's speed increases to about 10 times the speed of sound, the engine converts to a conventional rocket-powered system to propel the vehicle into orbit. Testing of the engine continues at General Applied Sciences Laboratory facilities on Long Island, N.Y.

=== Other advancements ===
Along with air-breathing propulsion, there is also magnetic levitation, highly integrated airframe structures that morph in flight, and intelligent vehicle health management systems are some of the other technologies being considered for a third generation RLV.

The ASTP is also investigating technologies for a fourth generation reusable launch vehicles that could be operational in the 2040 time-frame. The goal is to make space travel safer by a factor of 20,000 and more affordable by a factor of 1,000, compared to present day systems. Routine passenger space travel is envisioned for this fourth generation RLV.

== Accessible outer space ==
As access to outer space improves and becomes routine, this will enable new markets to open up. This includes space-based adventure tourism and travel, along with space-based business parks. Other types of benefits to commerce and the global population includes solar electric power beamed from space to Earth, space-based hospitals for treatment of chronic pain and disabilities, mining asteroids for high-value minerals, and a worldwide, two-hour express package delivery system.

== Beyond Earth's orbit ==
The ASTP is developing technologies to decrease the trip times and reduce the weight of the propulsion systems required for planetary missions - including riskier missions to the edge of the Solar System and beyond. Some of the technologies under development to accomplish these goals are electrodynamic tethers, solar sails, aeroassist and high-power electric propulsion (ion thruster) are just a few of the technologies being developed to achieve the goals.

The ASTP is also conducting fundamental research on the cutting edge of modern science and engineering, including fission, fusion and antimatter propulsion, and breakthrough physics theories that might enable thrusting against space-time itself and faster-than-light travel.

== ASTP team ==
The ASTP leads a team of NASA centers, US Government agencies, industry and academia focused on products and developing a variety of propulsion and vehicle technologies. Technology development is concentrated in the areas of hypersonic transportation, travel beyond low Earth orbit, and advanced concepts research.

== See also ==
- Jet Propulsion Laboratory Science Division
- Mars exploration
- Mars rovers
- Planetary exploration
