= Metal matrix composite =

Composite material consisting of fibers or particles in a metallic matrix

In materials science, a metal matrix composite (MMC) is a composite material with fibers or particles dispersed in a metallic matrix, such as copper, aluminum, or steel. The secondary phase is typically a ceramic (such as alumina or silicon carbide) or another metal (such as steel). They are typically classified according to the type of reinforcement: short discontinuous fibers (whiskers), continuous fibers, or particulates. There is some overlap between MMCs and cermets, with the latter typically consisting of less than 20% metal by volume. When at least three materials are present, it is called a hybrid composite. MMCs can have much higher strength-to-weight ratios, stiffness, and ductility than traditional materials, so they are often used in demanding applications. MMCs typically have lower thermal and electrical conductivity and poor resistance to radiation, limiting their use in the very harshest environments.

== Composition ==
MMCs are made by dispersing a reinforcing material into a metal matrix. The reinforcement surface can be coated to prevent a chemical reaction with the matrix. For example, carbon fibers are commonly used in aluminium matrix to synthesize composites showing low density and high strength. However, carbon reacts with aluminium to generate a brittle and water-soluble compound Al_{4}C_{3} on the surface of the fiber. To prevent this reaction, the carbon fibers are coated with nickel or titanium boride.

=== Matrix ===
The matrix is the monolithic material into which the reinforcement is embedded, and is completely continuous. This means that there is a path through the matrix to any point in the material, unlike two materials sandwiched together. In structural applications, the matrix is usually a lighter metal such as aluminum, magnesium, or titanium, and provides a complete support for the reinforcement. In high-temperature applications, cobalt and cobalt–nickel alloy matrices are common.

=== Reinforcement ===
The reinforcement material is embedded into a matrix. The reinforcement does not always serve a purely structural task (reinforcing the compound), but is also used to change physical properties such as wear resistance, friction coefficient, or thermal conductivity. The reinforcement can be either continuous or discontinuous. Discontinuous MMCs can be isotropic and can be worked with standard metalworking techniques, such as extrusion, forging, or rolling. In addition, they may be machined using conventional techniques, but commonly would need the use of polycrystalline-diamond tooling (PCD).

Continuous reinforcement uses monofilament wires or fibers such as carbon fiber or silicon carbide. Because the fibers are embedded into the matrix in a certain direction, the result is an anisotropic structure in which the alignment of the material affects its strength. One of the first MMCs used boron filament as reinforcement. Discontinuous reinforcement uses "whiskers", short fibers, or particles. The most common reinforcing materials in this category are alumina and silicon carbide.

== Manufacturing and forming methods ==
MMC manufacturing can be broken into three types—solid, liquid, and vapor.

=== Solid-state methods ===
- Powder blending and consolidation (powder metallurgy): Powdered metal and discontinuous reinforcement are mixed and then bonded through a process of compaction, degassing, and thermo-mechanical treatment (possibly via hot isostatic pressing (HIP) or extrusion).
- Foil diffusion bonding: Layers of metal foil are sandwiched with long fibers, and then pressed through to form a matrix.

=== Liquid-state methods ===
- Electroplating and electroforming: A solution containing metal ions loaded with reinforcing particles is co-deposited forming a composite material.
- Stir casting: Discontinuous reinforcement is stirred into molten metal, which is allowed to solidify.
- Pressure infiltration: Molten metal is infiltrated into the reinforcement through the use of a kind of pressure such as gas pressure.
- Squeeze casting: Molten metal is injected into a form with fibers pre-placed inside it.
- Spray deposition: Molten metal is sprayed onto a continuous fiber substrate.
- Reactive processing: A chemical reaction occurs, with one of the reactants forming the matrix and the other the reinforcement.

=== Semi-solid-state methods ===
- Semi-solid powder processing: A powder mixture is heated up to semi-solid state and pressure is applied to form the composites.

=== Vapor deposition ===
- Physical vapor deposition: The fiber is passed through a thick cloud of vaporized metal, coating it.

=== In-situ fabrication techniques ===
- Controlled unidirectional solidification of a eutectic alloy can result in a two-phase microstructure with one of the phases, present in lamellar or fiber form, distributed in the matrix.

== Residual stress ==
MMCs are fabricated at elevated temperatures, which is an essential condition for diffusion bonding of the fiber/matrix interface. Later on, when they are cooled down to the ambient temperature, residual stresses are generated in the composite due to the mismatch between the coefficients of the metal matrix and fiber. The manufacturing residual stresses significantly influence the mechanical behavior of the MMCs in all loading conditions. In some cases, thermal residual stresses are high enough to initiate plastic deformation within the matrix during the manufacturing process.

== Effect on mechanical properties ==
The addition of ceramic particles in general increases the strength of the material while having a tradeoff on material ductility. For example, a Al-Al_{2}O_{3} composite can increase the yield strength of cast Al 6061 alloys from 105 to 120 MPa and increase the Young's modulus from 70 to 95 GPa. However, the composite had negative effects on the ductility, decreasing it from 10% to 2%. Ultimately, the increase in elastic modulus is significant because the metals get the benefit of the higher specific stiffness of ceramics while retaining some ductility. Metal-matrix composites can also significantly increase the wear resistance and hardness of aluminum alloys. Al_{2}O_{3} particles were found to significantly increase the wear resistance of an Al-Si alloy, and SiO_{2} particles increased the hardness of a Al-Mg alloy significantly. The application of this is in light, wear-resistant alloys for wear components such as piston liners in automobile engines. Current aluminum alloys are soft and often require hard, heavy cast-iron liners, which reduces the benefits of the lightweight aluminum engines.

Fracture toughness of the composites is typically dominated by the metal phases; however, it can also be dominated by the ceramic phase or delamination, depending on the material system. For example, the Cu/Al_{2}O_{3} system has a high thermal expansion mismatch, causing localized stresses that encourage crack propagation in the form of delamination. This significantly inhibits its fracture toughness compared to other compositions. In an Al/Al_{2}O_{3} co-continuous system, the crack propagated through the ceramic phase and was deflected upon reaching interfaces with the metallic phases. As a result, more energy was needed to deflect the crack around the phases, and the composite was significantly toughened. Overall, fracture toughness is largely dependent on MMC composition due to thermal mismatch and crack modes but can toughen composites with low thermal mismatch.

MMCs strengthen materials against plasticity for a variety of reasons. The first is direct load transfer to the stronger ceramic particles. The second is due to the difference in plastic deformation of the two components. This causes a dislocation to become pinned on the stronger particles and bow around them to continue moving. Dislocations typically drive plastic deformation due to the lower energy to move them rather than moving an entire plane of atoms. Therefore, pinning them causes a large increase in the energy and stress required for plastic deformation (see precipitation hardening). The final mechanism is caused by the stress from thermal and coherency mismatch. This creates a stress field, which traps dislocations, creating a pileup, further inhibiting plastic deformation.

== Applications ==
- High-performance tungsten carbide cutting tools are made from a tough cobalt matrix cementing the hard tungsten carbide particles; lower-performance tools can use other metals such as bronze as the matrix.
- Some tank armors may be made from metal matrix composites, probably steel-reinforced with boron nitride, which is a good reinforcement for steel because it is very stiff and it does not dissolve in molten steel.
- Some automotive disc brakes use MMCs. Early Lotus Elise models used aluminum MMC rotors, but they have less-than-optimal heat properties, and Lotus has since switched back to cast iron. Modern high-performance sports cars, such as those built by Porsche, use rotors made of carbon fiber within a silicon carbide matrix because of its high specific heat and thermal conductivity. 3M developed a preformed aluminum matrix insert for strengthening cast aluminum disc brake calipers, reducing weight by half compared to cast iron while retaining similar stiffness. 3M has also used alumina preforms for AMC pushrods.
- Cosworth uses a metal matrix composite piston for their Cosworth GMA V12 engine on the Gordon Murray Automotive T.50 and Gordon Murray Automotive T.33 supercars.
- Ford offers a metal matrix composite driveshaft upgrade. The MMC driveshaft is made of an aluminum matrix reinforced with boron carbide, allowing the critical speed of the driveshaft to be raised by reducing inertia. The MMC driveshaft has become a common modification for racers, allowing the top speed to be increased far beyond the safe operating speeds of a standard aluminum driveshaft.
- Honda has used aluminum matrix composite cylinder liners in some of their engines, including the B21A1, H22A and H23A, F20C and F22C, and the C32B used in the NSX.
- Toyota has since used metal matrix composites in the Yamaha-designed 2ZZ-GE engine which is used in the later Lotus Elise S2 versions as well as Toyota car models, including the eponymous Toyota Matrix. Porsche also uses MMCs to reinforce the engine's cylinder sleeves in the Boxster and 911.
- The F-16 Fighting Falcon uses monofilament silicon carbide fibers in a titanium matrix for a structural component of the jet's landing gear.
- Specialized Bicycles has used aluminum MMC compounds for its top-of-the-range bicycle frames for several years. Griffen Bicycles also made boron carbide–aluminum MMC bike frames, and Univega briefly did so as well.
- Some equipment in particle accelerators such as radio-frequency quadrupoles or electron targets use copper MMC compounds such as Glidcop to retain the material properties of copper at high temperatures and radiation levels.
- A copper-silver alloy matrix containing 55% by volume diamond particles, known as dymalloy, is used as a substrate for high-power, high-density multi-chip modules in electronics for its very high thermal conductivity. AlSiC is an aluminium–silicon carbide composite for similar applications.
- Aluminium-graphite composites are used in power-electronic modules because of their high thermal conductivities, the adjustable coefficients of thermal expansion, and their low densities.

MMCs are nearly always more expensive than the more conventional materials they are replacing. As a result, they are found where improved properties and performance can justify the added cost. Today, these applications are found most often in aircraft components, space systems, and high-end or "boutique" sports equipment. The scope of applications will certainly increase as manufacturing costs are reduced.

In comparison with conventional polymer matrix composites, MMCs are resistant to fire, can operate in wider range of temperatures, do not absorb moisture, have better electrical and thermal conductivity, are resistant to radiation damage, and do not display outgassing. On the other hand, MMCs tend to be more expensive, the fiber-reinforced materials may be difficult to fabricate, and the available experience in use is limited.

== See also ==
- Advanced composite materials
- Babbitt (metal)
- Wrought iron
