= Cosworth GMA =

Overview
- Manufacturer: Cosworth
- Production: 2020–present

Layout
- Configuration: V12, naturally-aspirated, 65° cylinder angle
- Displacement: 3,994 cc (4.0 L; 243.7 cu in)
- Cylinder bore: 81.5 mm (3.21 in)
- Piston stroke: 63.8 mm (2.51 in)
- Cylinder block material: Aluminum alloy
- Cylinder head material: Aluminum alloy
- Valvetrain: DOHC, four-valves per cylinder
- Compression ratio: 14:1

Combustion
- Fuel system: Direct fuel injection
- Oil system: Dry sump
- Cooling system: water-cooled – twin-aluminium front radiators

Output
- Power output: 607–775 hp (453–578 kW)
- Torque output: 320–358 lb⋅ft (434–485 N⋅m)

Dimensions
- Dry weight: 162–178 kg (357.1–392.4 lb)

The GMA is a 4.0-litre, naturally aspirated V12 engine, commissioned by Gordon Murray, and developed and produced by Cosworth for the Gordon Murray Automotive T.50 and T.33 sports cars. The road-going engine is rated at 664 PS (488 kW; 655 hp) at 11,500 rpm, with a max torque figure of 345 lb⋅ft (468 N⋅m) at 9,000 rpm, and a maximum rpm redline of 12,100 rpm making it the highest revving road car engine ever produced. The engine is also more powerful than the 6.1 L (6,064 cc) S70/2 V12 engine used in the McLaren F1.

== Background ==
For its first vehicle, GMA enlisted trusted engine designer Cosworth, which had worked alongside Murray in the past, to design and manufacture a brand new V12 to power the T.50.

GMA commissioned Cosworth to design an automotive engine that would compete with McLaren F1 in terms of low weight, sound quality, response time and aesthetics.

The goal was to keep the engine displacement as small as possible in order to deliver unrivalled power-to-weight for a vehicle weighing under 1,000 kg. The streamlined 3.9-litre V12 delivered was free of both coverings and belt-driven accessories and became the highest-revving engine ever made for a production car.

The T.50’s version of the GMA V12 engine generates high-end power of 663 PS (654 hp) at 11,500 rpm. The maximum torque figure of 467 Nm (344 ft-lb) is produced at 9,000 rpm, with 71% of available torque produced as low as 2,500 rpm. Its block is constructed from a high-strength aluminium alloy, the steel crankshaft weighs only 13 kg (29 lb), the pistons are made from a Metal matrix composite (MMC), and the connecting rods and valves are made of titanium (as is the clutch housing). At 178 kg (392 lb), the engine is the lightest ever for a supercar, and its output of 166 PS per litre is the highest of any naturally-aspirated road car engine.

== Variants ==
A more powerful, track-only, racing version of the GMA engine will also be produced, and is set to be used in a racing-focused variant of the T.50, called the Gordon Murray Automotive T.50s Niki Lauda. Power and torque figures for the T.50s have been substantially boosted over the standard road car's engine; now producing 711 PS (523 kW; 701 hp) at 11,500 rpm, and 485 N⋅m (358 lbf⋅ft) at 9,000 rpm, an increase of 48 PS (35 kW; 47 hp) and 18 N⋅m (13 lbf⋅ft) over the standard car. Output is raised to 735 PS (541 kW; 725 hp) at 11,500 rpm, when fitted with a ram-air intake. The T.50s also now generates about 138.7 kW (188.6 PS; 186.0 hp) per litre. The racing version of the GMA engine also has had various tweaks, including removing the catalytic converters from the exhaust system, narrower inconel walls, and smaller mufflers, now weighing 162 kg (357 lb). It's 16 kg (35 lb) lighter than the T.50's engine, making it the lightest V12 engine ever.

== Engine specifications ==
- Engine type: V12
- Capacity: 4.0 L (3,994 cc; 243.7 cu in)
- V angle (degrees): 65°
- Aspiration: Naturally-aspirated
- Bore: 81.5 mm (3.2 in)
- Stroke: 63.8 mm (2.5 in)
- Compression ratio: 15:1
- Maximum power output: 615–735 PS (452–541 kW; 607–725 hp) at 10,500–11,500 rpm
- Maximum torque output: 435–485 N⋅m (321–358 lbf⋅ft) at 9,000 rpm
- Flexibility: 71–75% of maximum torque at 2,500 rpm
- Maximum rpm: 12,100 rpm
- Valvetrain: double overhead camshafts, inclined axis, 4 valves per cylinder – variable valve timing on inlet / exhaust
- Induction system: RAM induction airbox – 4 throttle bodies – Direct Path Induction Sound
- Exhaust system: Inconel and Titanium
- Lubrication system: dry sump
- Cooling system: water-cooled – twin-aluminium front radiators
- Oil cooling system: Single aluminium rear radiator
- Ignition system: 12 individual coils, 12-volt
- Exhaust emission control: 4 catalytic converters with lambda sensors and secondary air injection
- Engine block: Aluminium alloy
- Cylinder heads: Aluminium alloy
- Connecting rods: Titanium
- Valves: Titanium
- Pistons: Metal matrix composite
- Total engine weight: 162–178 kg (357.1–392.4 lb)
- Engine mounting: Semi-structural-inclined axis shear mounting (IASM)
- Power density: 166 PS per litre

== Applications ==
- Gordon Murray Automotive T.50
- Gordon Murray Automotive T.33
- Gordon Murray Automotive S1
