= Gordon Murray Automotive T.50 =

Sports car

Gordon Murray Automotive Type 50
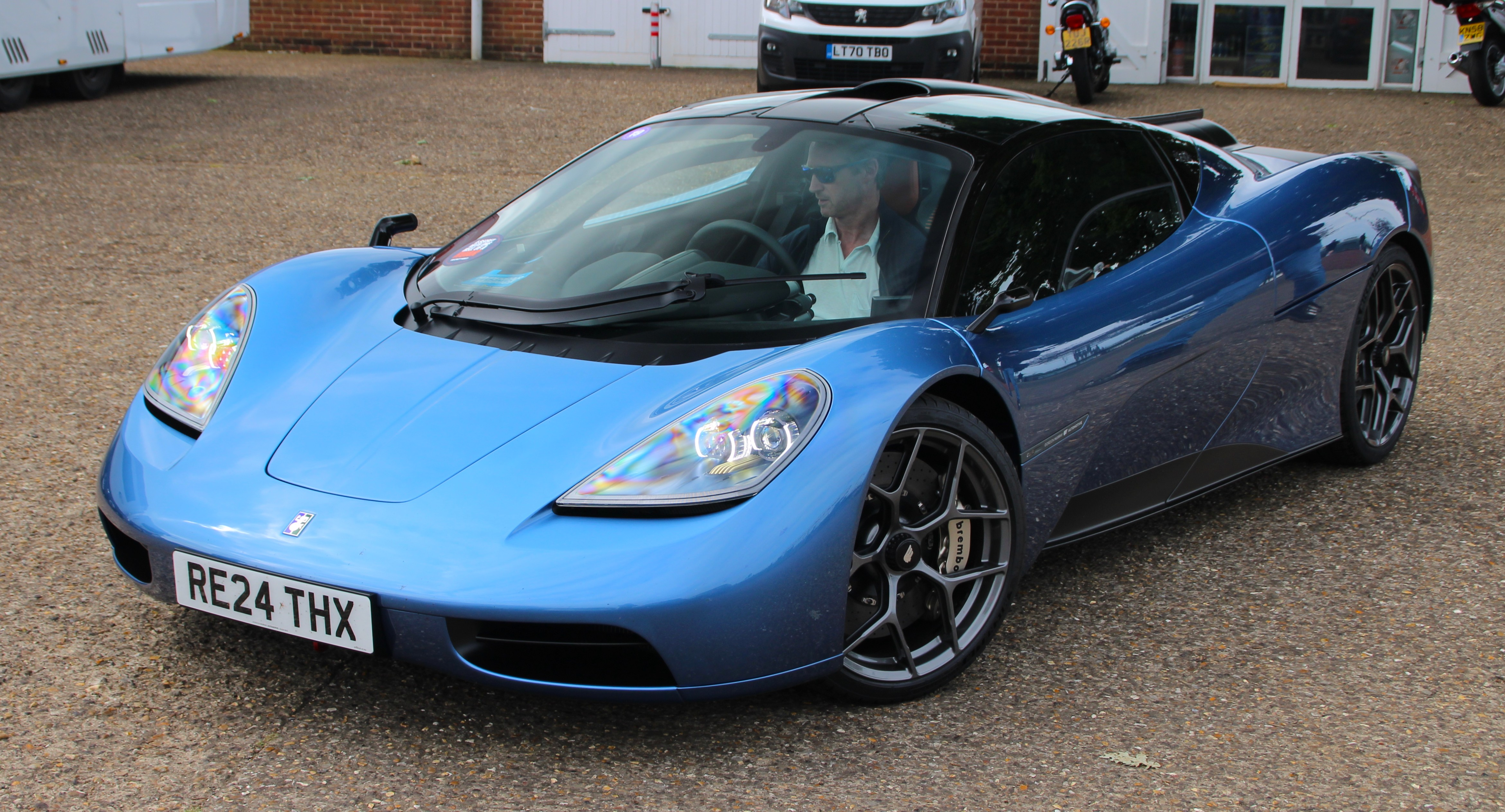

Overview
- Manufacturer: Gordon Murray Automotive
- Also called: GMA T.50
- Assembly: England: Windlesham, Surrey (Gordon Murray Design Ltd)
- Designer: Gordon Murray

Body and chassis
- Class: Sports car (S)
- Body style: 2-door coupé
- Layout: Rear mid-engine, rear-wheel-drive
- Doors: Butterfly
- Related: Gordon Murray Automotive T.33; Gordon Murray Automotive S1

Powertrain
- Engine: 4.0 L; 243.7 cu in (3,994 cc) "3.9 L" Cosworth GMA V12
- Power output: 663 PS (488 kW; 654 hp) 467 N⋅m (344 lbf⋅ft) of torque; 772 PS (568 kW; 761 hp) 497 N⋅m (367 lbf⋅ft) of torque (T.50s Niki Lauda)
- Transmission: 6-speed Xtrac H-pattern manual

Dimensions
- Wheelbase: 2,700 mm (106.3 in)
- Length: 4,352 mm (171.3 in)
- Width: 1,850 mm (72.8 in)
- Height: 1,164 mm (45.8 in)
- Kerb weight: 997 kg (2,198 lb) (dry)

The Gordon Murray Automotive Type 50 or GMA T.50 is a sports car manufactured by Gordon Murray Automotive. Designed by Gordon Murray and inspired by the McLaren F1, the T.50 is powered by an all-new 3,994 cc (4.0 L) naturally aspirated V12 engine developed by Cosworth. The engine is rated at 663 PS (488 kW; 654 hp) at 11,500 rpm with a maximum torque of 467 N⋅m (344 lbf⋅ft) at 9,000 rpm.

The T.50 achieves a dry weight of 997 kg (2,198 lb), making it lighter than the vast majority of vehicles in its class, with its naturally aspirated V12 weighing only 178 kg (392 lb) and its chassis being 30 kg (66 lb) lighter than the McLaren F1's. As a result, the T.50 features one of the highest power-to-weight ratios amongst its class at 501 kW (672 hp) per tonne, while its engine attains a specific output of 122.1 kW (163.7 hp; 166 PS) per litre.

== Aerodynamics ==
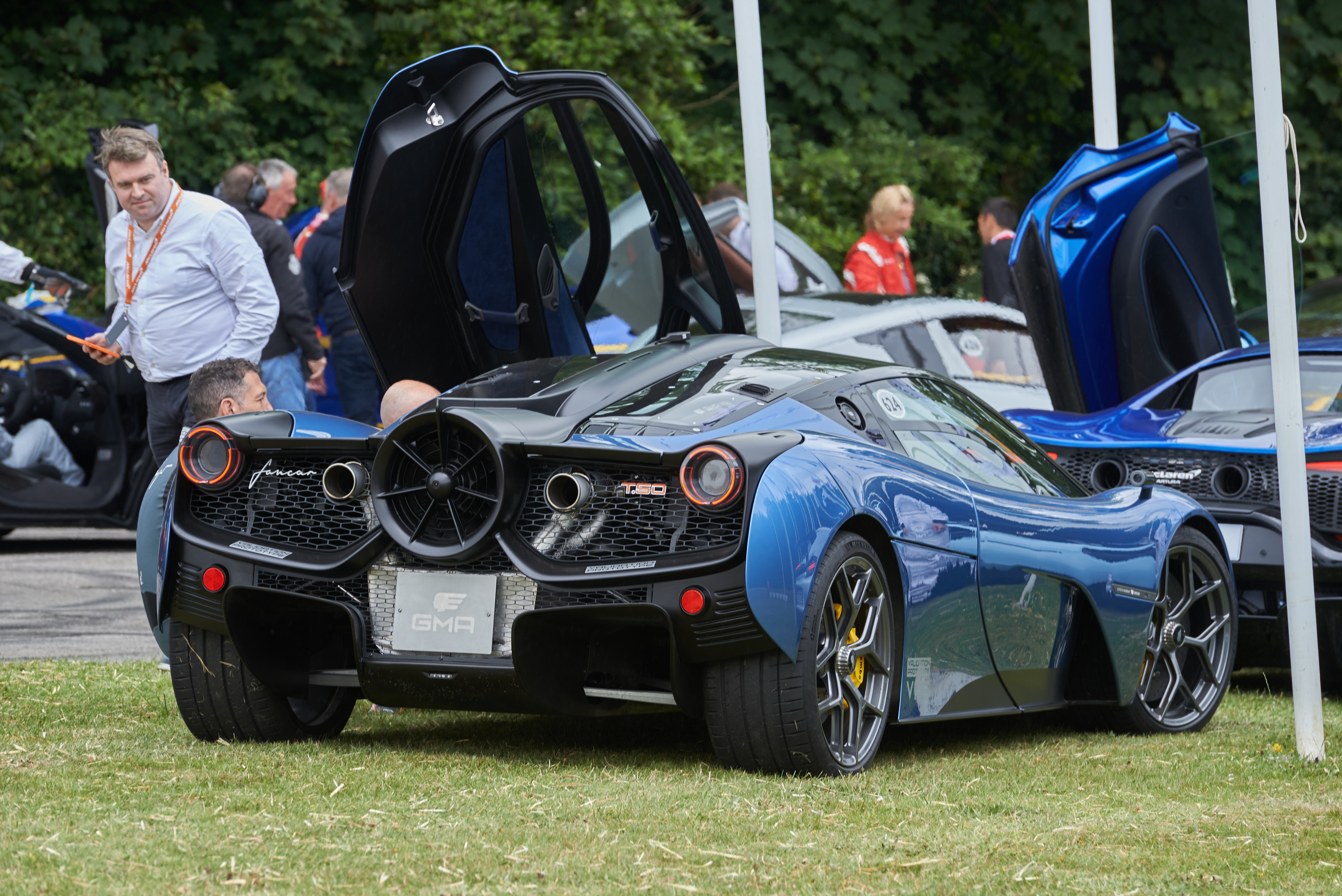
Rear view

A distinctive feature of the GMA T.50 is the 8.5 kW 40 cm aerodynamic fan integrated into the rear of the car, powered by a 48 volt electrical motor. Inspired by the Brabham BT46B Formula One car, it is purpose-built to significantly improve the ground effect of the T.50. As the T.50 makes use of very aggressive and steep angled rear diffusers, this in turn creates substantial turbulent or semi-stalled air passing over the diffuser when the T.50 has its fan inactive. By utilising the integrated aerodynamic fan, the T.50 can suck the air under the car at a 90-degree angle and provide a significant increase in overall downforce as it provides a laminar flow of air passing over the rear diffuser, thus, creating a greater level of suction in tandem with the Venturi effect, created underneath the car, ahead of the steep rear diffusers. This allows the T.50 to control the boundary layer and turbulent vortices underneath the car, significantly improving downforce. As a result of the T.50’s fan-assisted aerodynamic design, the need for any aerodynamic package on the front or rear of the T.50, such as a splitter, a wing or an aggressive aerodynamic design are considered ineffective in providing further downforce and are thus considered negligible, allowing a free form and flowing exterior design. The T.50 does make use of active aero spoilers however, that operate in conjunction with the aerodynamic fan. The active aero and fan functionality of the car is dependent on the driver selected mode which is provided in six presets made available in the interior of the car. The fan assisted aero design allows for a 30% increase in downforce when a 'high downforce' mode is selected, channelling air through aero ducts perpendicular to the airflow underneath the car, providing a high suction ground effect. Furthermore, under braking the T.50 provides 100% additional downforce by extending the active spoilers to a 45-degree angle of attack and utilising diffuser ducts. The T.50 can also achieve reductions in drag by selecting the specialised mode presets of 'streamline' and 'Vmax' modes, allowing for a 12.5% reduction in overall drag.

== Comparisons to the McLaren F1 ==
The car has been noted for its numerous similarities to the McLaren F1, produced between 1992 and 1998, which Gordon Murray conceptualised and co-designed. The T.50 has been described by Gordon Murray Automotive as being the "spiritual successor to the Murray-devised McLaren F1". The T.50 shares familiar features with the F1: a central driving position with two passenger seats flanking the driver, a six-speed manual gearbox, V12 powertrain, small opening 'ticket' windows in the otherwise fixed side window and dihedral 'wing' doors.

The T.50 addresses many of the design and engineering inadequacies of the 90s supercar, many of those the result of period design practices and time and budget constraints enforced by McLaren. As recorded by Murray "the spine is 50 mm too wide, the headlamps are like glow worms in a jar, the air-con was hopeless, the brakes squeak, the clutch needs adjusting every 5,000 miles, the fuel tank bag replacing every five years, loading luggage in the lockers was a pain. This all stuck in my head".

== Production ==
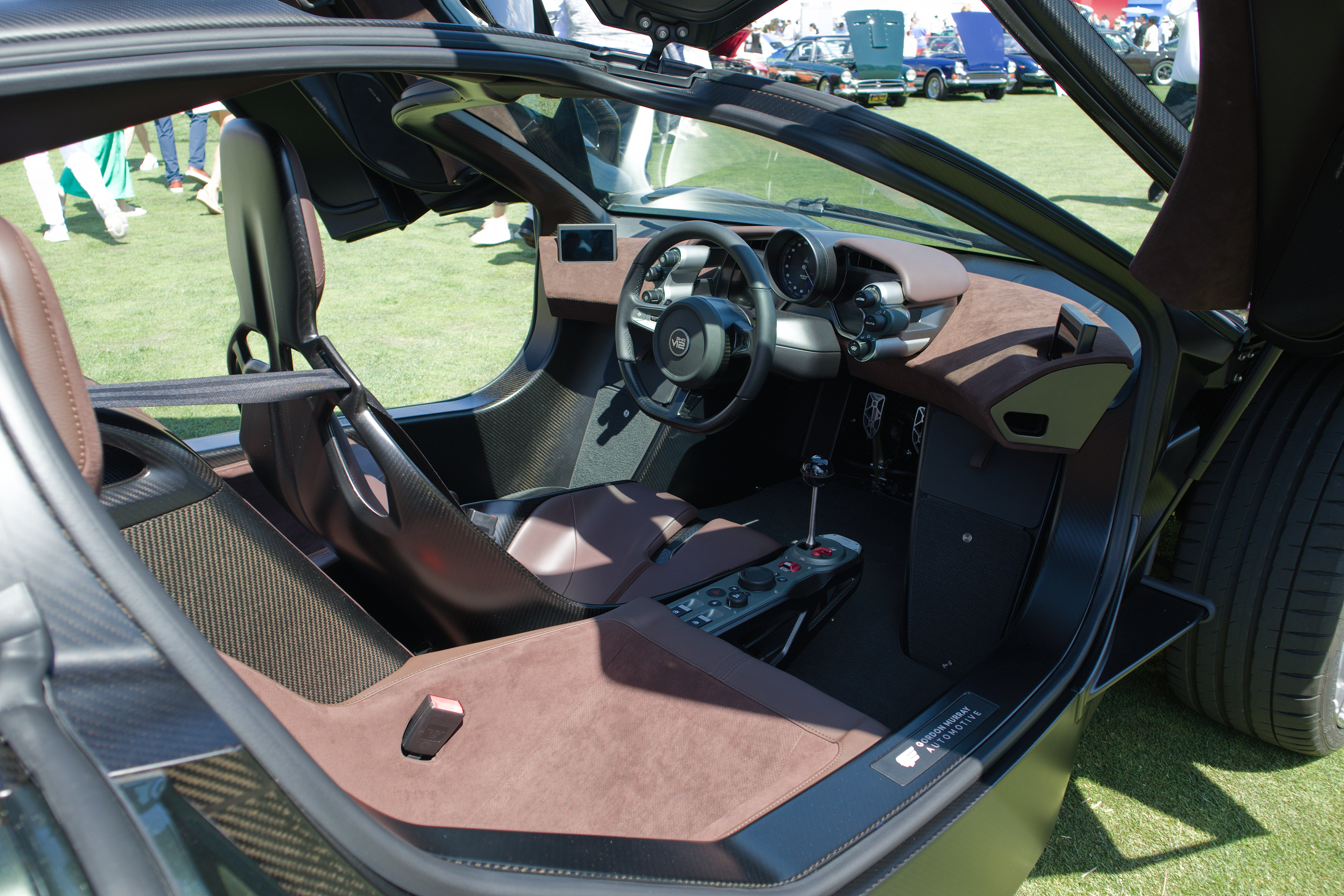
Interior

GMA plans to build 100 customer cars at its Surrey production site. Autocar reported that the T.50 entered production in March 2023. Each car cost £2.36 million before local taxes and all of the planned 100 road spec units were sold within 48 hours of its global premiere. As of August 2020 there are to be 13 GMA T.50 prototypes to pass crash, durability and emission regulations.

== Performance ==
Car and Driver published performance figures for the T.50, including acceleration from 0-60 mph (97 km/h) in 2.9 seconds and a top speed of 226 mph (364 km/h).

== Variants ==
=== T.50s Niki Lauda ===
There will be 25 track-only variants of the car, designated as the Gordon Murray Automotive T.50s Niki Lauda, priced at £3.1 million before taxes. Top Gear reported that the car was developed for up to 1,500 kg of downforce and a weight of 852 kg.

The car features a sequential pre-selector 6-speed transmission with paddle shifters on the yoke steering wheel. It doesn't have two rear active flaps but rather manually adjustable front and rear aero. There is an optional co-driver seat that adds 5.1 kg. The engine has 12 throttle bodies (as opposed to the road-going T.50's 4), no VVT, no catalytic converters, higher compression ratio (15:1) and uses different materials in some parts. It was designed separately from the road T.50 because Gordon Murray intended the McLaren F1 to be a road car and was forced to race it but he says it was a pain and he didn't want to repeat it.

== See also ==
- McMurtry Spéirling, a 2021 prototype electric car which also uses fans for added downforce
