= High-performance equipment =

Telecommunications equipment

High-performance equipment describes telecommunications equipment that

(a) has the performance characteristics required for use in trunks or links,
(b) is designed primarily for use in global and tactical systems, and
(c) sufficiently withstands electromagnetic interference when operating in a variety of network or point-to-point circuits.

Note: Requirements for global and tactical high-performance equipment may differ.

This article incorporates public domain material from Federal Standard 1037C. General Services Administration. Archived from the original on 2022-01-22. (in support of MIL-STD-188).
