= Spray forming =

Method of casting near-net-shape metal components

Spray forming, also known as spray casting, spray deposition and in-situ compaction, is a method of casting near-net-shape metal components with homogeneous microstructures via the deposition of semi-solid sprayed droplets onto a shaped substrate. In spray forming, an alloy is melted, normally in an induction furnace, and the molten metal is slowly poured through a conical tundish into a small-bore ceramic nozzle. The molten metal exits the furnace as a thin, free-falling stream and is broken up into droplets by an annular array of gas jets, and these droplets then proceed downwards, accelerated by the gas jets to impact onto a substrate. The process is arranged such that the droplets strike the substrate whilst in the semi-solid condition; this provides sufficient liquid fraction to "stick" the solid fraction together. Deposition continues, gradually building up a spray-formed billet of metal on the substrate.

The gas atomised spray forming (GASF) process typically has a molten alloy flow rate of 1–20 kg/min, although twin-atomizer systems can achieve metal flow rates of up to 80 kg/min. Special steel billets of 1 tonne or more have been produced by spray forming on a commercial basis, together with nickel super-alloy ring blanks of up to 500 kg and aluminium alloy extrusion billets of up to 400 kg.

A Double Spray Forming process, developed recently, can deposite two types of alloys simultaneously under a protective high-purity argon atmosphere which allows production of in-situ layered composites. This method allows direct layer by layer deposition of different metallic materials (layer 1 as hard material and layer 2 as a soft one) from two opposite jets with good interlayer adhesion without formation of internal oxides.

== History ==
Professor Singer at the Swansea University first developed the idea of gas-atomised spray forming in the 1970s in which a high-pressure gas jet impinges on a stable melt stream to cause atomisation. The resulting droplets are then collected on a target, which can be manipulated within the spray and used to form a near-dense billet of near-net shape. Spray forming has found applications in specialist industries such as stainless steel cladding of incinerator tubes; nickel superalloy discs and rings for aerospace-engines; aluminium-titanium, aluminium-neodymium, and aluminium-silver sputter targets; aluminium-silicon alloys for cylinder liners; and high-speed steels. The history of spray forming is an example of how the creative contributions of many researchers were necessary over a number of years to produce the innovation of a now-widely-used industrial process.

== Advantages ==
Spray forming offers certain advantages over both conventional ingot metallurgy and more specialized techniques such as powder metallurgy. Firstly, it is a flexible process and can be used to manufacture a wide range of materials, some of which are difficult to produce by other methods, such as Al-5wt% lithium alloys or Al-SiC and Al-Al_{2}O_{3} metal matrix composites (MMCs). The atomisation of the melt stream into droplets of 10-500 μm diameter, some of which, depending on diameter, cool quickly to the solid and semi-solid state, provides a large number of nucleants for the residual liquid fraction of the spray-formed material on the billet's top surface. The combination of rapid cooling in the spray and the generation of a large population of solid nucleants in the impacting spray leads to a fine equiaxed microstructure, typically in the range 10–100 μm, with low levels and short length scales of internal solute partitioning. These microstructural aspects offer advantages in material strength because of fine grain size, refined distribution of dispersoid or secondary precipitate phases, and tolerance to impurity "tramp" elements. This fine structure in the "as-sprayed" condition means that homogenising heat treatments can often be avoided. Because of the complex solidification path (that is, the rapid transition from superheated melt to solid, liquid, or semi-solid droplet to temperature equilibration at semi-solid billet top and final slow cooling to fully solid) of the spray-formed material, extended solubility of alloying elements and the formation of metastable and quasi-crystalline phases has also been reported.

One of the major attractions of spray forming is the potential economic benefit to be gained from reducing the number of process steps between melt and finished product. Spray forming can be used to produce strip, tube, ring, clad bar / roll, and cylindrical extrusion feed stock products, in each case with a relatively fine-scale microstructure even in large cross-sections. The benefits of GASF over powder metallurgy accrue from the reduced number of process steps where powder sieving, pressing, de-gassing, and handling steps and their attendant safety and contamination issues may be removed.

== Disadvantages ==
There are two major disadvantages to the gas atomisation spray forming process. The most significant disadvantage is the relatively low process yield with typical losses of ~30%. Losses occur because of overspray (droplets missing the emerging billet), splashing of material from the billet surface, and material bouncing off the semi-solid top surface. Many operators of the spray-forming process now use a particle injector system to re-inject the overspray powder, and thus recycle material that would otherwise be lost, or sell the overspray powder as a product in its own right. The second major disadvantage is one of process control. As it is essentially a free-forming process with many interdependent variables, it has proved difficult to predict the shape, porosity, or deposition rate for a given alloy. Much of the control is based on operator experience and empirical relationships. It is partly the process complexity and lack of robust process control that has prevented the widespread commercialisation of this process. Some developments using feed-back control have proved successful in improving the variations in billet diameter and improving yield in specific systems, but these have yet to find widespread implementation.

Porosity resulting from gas entrapment and solidification shrinkage is a significant problem in spray-formed materials. A typical spray formed billet will contain 1–2% porosity, with a pore size dependent on alloy freezing range and various process parameters. Hot isostatic pressing (HIP) or thermo-mechanical processing can heal these pores if they are small (less than 30 μm). Despite these disadvantages, spray forming remains an economic process for the production of niche, difficult-to-manufacture alloys. Large-scale porosity is more difficult to heal effectively and must be minimised by careful process control. In some cases, porosity is controlled by alloy additions that react with dissolved and entrapped gas to form a solid phase, such as titanium added to copper billets to form titanium nitride with dissolved and entrapped nitrogen gas. Porosity, even after consolidation, can limit the applications of spray-formed material; for example, rotating gas turbine components must have zero porosity because of the detrimental effect on high-cycle fatigue (HCF).

== Commercialisation ==
In spite of the problems associated with the spray-forming process, there has been sustained industrial interest in spray forming over the last 35 years. Sandvik-Osprey (former Osprey Metals Ltd) of Neath, Wales, holds the patents on the process and have licensed the technology to a range of industries. There are currently approximately 25 licensees operating around the world, ranging from small research-and-development plants to full-scale commercial operations. Main applications are prematerial for low-temperature Nb_{3}Sn superconductors, oil-drilling equipment (high-strength material CuMnNi), and for forming tools (CuAlFe with high Al-content). In all of these applications, research concerns the reconciliation of the cost disadvantages and complexity of spray forming with the demand for high-performance alloys in niche applications.

== Melting ==
The earliest spray-forming work was based on a resistively heated electric holding furnace. The melt then passed through a 3-millimetre-diameter Al_{2}O_{3} nozzle. However, the low flow rate made a high superheat necessary to prevent solidification in the nozzle. The next-generation melting procedures in spray-forming applications were bottom-pour induction units, which offer many benefits. In this system, the melting crucible is directly above the atomiser head with a ceramic nozzle feeding directly from the furnace to the atomiser. A stopper rod runs through the melt to the top of the pouring nozzle; the rod is withdrawn when the melt reaches the designated temperature for spraying, typically 50 to 150 °C (122 to 302 °F) above the alloy's liquidus. Alternatively, a pre-prepared plug of alloy to block the nozzle is used, and at a specified superheat this plug melts, allowing the contents of the furnace to drain through the nozzle. Another problem associated with bottom-pour furnaces is the change in flow rate associated with the reducing metalo-static head in the crucible. In some cases, introducing an inert gas overpressure during pouring can compensate for this effect.

An alternative approach is the tilt-pour furnace whereby an induction furnace is tilted to pour the melt into a conical tundish that in turn delivers the molten metal to the melt delivery nozzle. The tilt-pour system provides the advantage that melting is decoupled from the spraying procedure so that melting problems and remedial solutions do not affect or disturb the critical set-up of the melt delivery nozzle.

In the most complex melting arrangement, used only for production of nickel superalloy turbine forging blanks by spray forming, vacuum induction melting, electroslag re-melting, and cold-hearth crucibles have been combined by GE to control alloy impurity levels and the presence of refractory inclusions in the molten metal supply. Clean metal spray forming (CMSF) combines the electroslag refining process, cold-walled induction guide, and gas-atomised spray forming. This approach has led to a reduction in the number of melt-related defects (pores, inclusions, etc.), a finer average grain size, the ability to produce larger ingots, and the ability to process a wider range of alloys.

== Atomisation ==
There are many different techniques for atomisation of molten metals, many of which are derived from the powder-metallurgy industry and have been extensively reviewed elsewhere. There are two major atomisation techniques used in spray forming: centrifugal atomisation for the manufacture of near-net-shape rings and gas atomisation for the manufacture of billets, tube, and strip.

=== Centrifugal atomisation ===
Centrifugal atomisation involves pouring molten metal at relatively low flow rates (0.1– 2 kg/min) onto a spinning plate, dish, or disc, whereby the rotation speed is sufficient to create high centrifugal forces at the periphery and overcome surface tension and viscous forces so the melt is fragmented into droplets. Droplet diameters produced by centrifugal atomisation are dependent primarily on the rotation speed (up to 20,000 rpm) and are typically in the range 20–1000 μm with cooling rates of the order 104 K/s. Centrifugal atomisation is generally conducted under an inert atmosphere of argon or N_{2} to prevent oxidation of the fine droplets or can be operated under vacuum.

=== Gas atomisation ===
The melt stream exits the melt delivery nozzle into the spray chamber. The melt stream is protected from being destabilised by the turbulent gas environment in the spray chamber by primary gas jets operating at intermediate inert gas pressures of 2 to 4 bar; the resulting gas flow is parallel to the melt stream to stabilise the melt stream. The secondary atomiser uses high-velocity (250 to 350 ms^{−1}), high-pressure (6 to 10 bar) gas jets to impinge on the melt stream to achieve atomisation. The atomiser jets are usually arranged as an annulus or as discrete jets positioned symmetrically about the melt delivery nozzle, or less commonly, arranged as a linear nozzle for the production of strip products. Typical droplet diameters follow a log-normal distribution with powder diameters up to ~600 μm with a mass median diameter of ~150 μm.

The ratio of atomising gas mass flow rate to molten metal mass flow rate ratio is a key parameter in controlling the droplet diameter and hence the cooling rate, billet temperature, and resulting solid particle nucleant density. The gas-metal ratio (GMR) is typically in the range 1.5 to 5.5, with yield decreasing and cooling rates in the spray increasing with increasing GMR. Typically at low (1.5) GMR, yield is 75%; if the GMR is increased to 5.0 with all other parameters remaining constant, the process yield is reduced to 60%.

Scanning atomisers have been developed which allow the production of billets of up to 600 mm diameter, approximately twice the diameter possible with a static atomiser. The atomiser head is oscillated mechanically through 5 to 10° at a typical frequency of 25 Hz to deflect the melt stream, creating a spray path that is synchronised with the rotation speed of the collector plate in order to deposit a parallel-sided billet. By using programmable oscillating-atomiser drives, it was possible to improve the shape and shape reproducibility of spray-formed deposits. It has been demonstrated that parallel-sided, flat-topped billets could be sprayed in a reproducible manner if the substrate rotation and atomiser oscillation frequency were synchronised and optimised for specific alloys and melt flow rates. Twin-atomiser systems combine a static and scanning atomiser, making it possible to spray billets of up to 450 mm diameter with economic benefits.

The atomising gas used in spray forming is generally either N_{2} and can be either protective or reactive depending on the alloy system, or argon which is generally entirely inert but more expensive than N_{2}. Reactive gasses can be introduced in small quantities to the atomising gas to create dispersion-strengthened alloys; for example, 0.5–10% O_{2} in N_{2} is used to generate oxide dispersion-strengthened (ODS) aluminium alloys. Comparisons of N_{2} and argon-based spray forming showed that, with all other factors remaining constant, the billet-top temperature was lower with N_{2} than with argon, because of the differences in thermal diffusivity of the two atomising gases: argon has a thermal conductivity of 0.0179 W/mK, which is approximately a third less than N_{2} with a thermal conductivity of 0.026 W/mK.

The mechanisms of melt breakup and atomisation have been extensively researched, showing that atomisation typically consists of 3 steps: (1) primary breakup of the melt stream; (2) molten droplets and ligaments undergo secondary disintegration; (3) particles cool and solidify. Theoretical analysis of the atomisation process to predict droplet size has yielded models providing only moderate agreement with experimental data.

Investigations show that in all cases gas atomisation of molten metal yields a broad range of droplet diameters, typically in the range 10–600 μm diameter, with a mean diameter of ~100 μm. Droplet diameter governs the dynamic behaviour of the droplet in flight, which in turn determines the time available for in-flight cooling, which is critical in controlling the resulting billet microstructure. At a flight distance of 300–400 mm, predictions show droplet velocities of 40–90 m/s for droplet diameters in the range 20–150 μm respectively, compared to measured velocities of ~100 m/s, and at distances of up to 180 mm from the atomiser, droplets were still being accelerated by the gas. Droplets cool in-flight predominantly by convection and radiation, and can experience undercooling of up to 300 °C (572 °F) prior to nucleation. Models and experimental measurements show that small droplets (<50 μm) very rapidly become fully solid prior to deposition, 50–200 μm droplets will be typically semi-solid, and droplets of diameters >200 μm will be liquid at deposition. The range of droplet dynamic and thermal histories result in a billet top surface of 0.3 to 0.6 solid fraction. Not all material that impacts the surface is incorporated into the billet: some solid droplets will bounce or splash off the billet top surface or be directed out of the deposition region by turbulent gas movement in the chamber. The proportion of droplets that impact the surface compared to the proportion that are incorporated into the billet has been termed the sticking efficiency, which depends on the geometric sticking, which is a function of the spray angle relative to substrate and the thermal sticking efficiency dependent on spray and billet solid/liquid fraction.

=== Spray formed microstructure ===
During spraying it is essential to maintain a constant top surface temperature and hence maintain steady-state conditions if a billet with consistent microstructure is to be produced. At the billet surface, during spraying, an enthalpy balance must be maintained where the rate of enthalpy lost (H_{out}) from the billet by conduction, convection, and radiation must be balanced with the rate of enthalpy input (H_{in}) from the droplets in the spray. There are a variety of factors that can be adjusted in order to maintain these conditions: spray height, atomiser gas pressure, melt flow rate, melt superheat, and atomiser configuration are those parameters most readily adjusted. Typically, equipment such as cameras and optical pyrometry can be used to monitor billet size/position and top-surface temperature. If H_{out} is much greater H_{in} then a steady temperature is maintained at the billet top surface. The top surface should be in a mushy condition in order to promote sticking of incoming droplets and partial re-melting of solid particles. The necessary partial re-melting of solid droplets explains the absence of dendritic remnants from pre-solidified droplets in the final microstructure. If H_{in} is insufficient to cause significant re-melting, then a "splat" microstructure of layered droplets will form, typical of thermal spray processes such as vacuum plasma spraying (VPS), arc spraying, and high-velocity oxy-fuel. Processing maps have been produced for plasma spraying and spray forming using a steady-state heat balance in terms of the interlayer time (time between deposition events) against average deposition rate per unit area. These maps show the boundaries between banded un-fused microstructure and an equiaxed homogeneous structure.

The final phase of solidification occurs once droplets have impacted the mushy billet surface and thermal equilibration has taken place between the droplets and the billet. At this stage, residual liquid is present as a continuous network delineating polygonal grain boundaries, with a typical liquid fraction of 0.3–0.5. The cooling rates during solidification of the billet is several orders of magnitude slower than the cooling rate in the spray, at 1-20 K/s.

Although one of the benefits of spray forming is purportedly the ability to produce bulk material with fine-scale microsegregation and little or no macrosegregation, work on Al-Mg-Li-Cu alloys showed that as a consequence of the interconnected liquid in the billet, there was significant macrosegregation in large spray-formed wrought Al billets. The distribution of Cu, Mg, and Li in, for example, Al alloy 8091 showed surprisingly pronounced macrosegregation with the variation of Cu(wt%) in a spray-formed 8091 billet, ranging from approximately 1.4 at the billet centre to 1.92 at the billet periphery. These macrosegregation patterns were explained in terms of inverse segregation in which solute-rich liquid from the billet centre is sucked back through the primary Al-rich network to feed solidification shrinkage at the billet periphery. This effect was suggested to be exacerbated by centrifugal effects from the billet rotation.

As sprayed, the billet porosity is typically 1–2% with a region of higher porosity in the splat-quenched region adjacent to the substrate. The very top of the billet often shows increased porosity because the top is rapidly chilled by the atomising gas which continues to chill the billet for 10–60 seconds after spraying. There has also been little progress in understanding and quantifying the underlying physics that controls as-sprayed porosity.

In most cases, the higher porosity at the billet base and top are scalped and recycled. Ultrasonic inspection is sometimes used to determine the depth of the chill-zone regions to prevent unnecessary wastage. Depending on the alloy system and the final application, the remaining bulk material is usually processed to close porosity and subjected to a range of thermo-mechanical treatments. Spray-formed materials are rarely used in the as-sprayed condition and are often treated by HIPing to remove porosity. In some cases, the residual atomising gas in pores may react with alloying elements to form allegedly beneficial phases, such as N_{2} reacting with titanium in the nickel superalloy Rene 80 to form a dispersion of TiN.
