= Near net shape =

Near-net-shape is an industrial manufacturing technique. As the name implies, the initial production of the item is very close to the final, or net, shape. This reduces the need for surface finishing. By minimizing the use of finishing methods like machining or grinding, near-net-shape production eliminates more than two-thirds of the production costs in some industries.

== Processes ==
The following are various near-net-shape processes categorized by material.

=== Ceramics ===
- Gelcasting
- Ceramic injection molding
- Spray forming
- Structural ceramic production

=== Composites ===
- Lanxide process

=== Plastics ===
- Injection moulding
- Rapid prototyping

=== Metals ===
- Casting
  - Permanent mold casting
- Powder metallurgy
- Linear friction welding
- Friction welding
- Metal injection molding
- Rapid prototyping
- Spray forming
- Superplastic forming
- Cold forming
- Semi-solid metal casting
- Photochemical machining
- Hot isostatic pressing
