= Gordon Murray Automotive T.33 =

Sports car

Gordon Murray Automotive Type 33
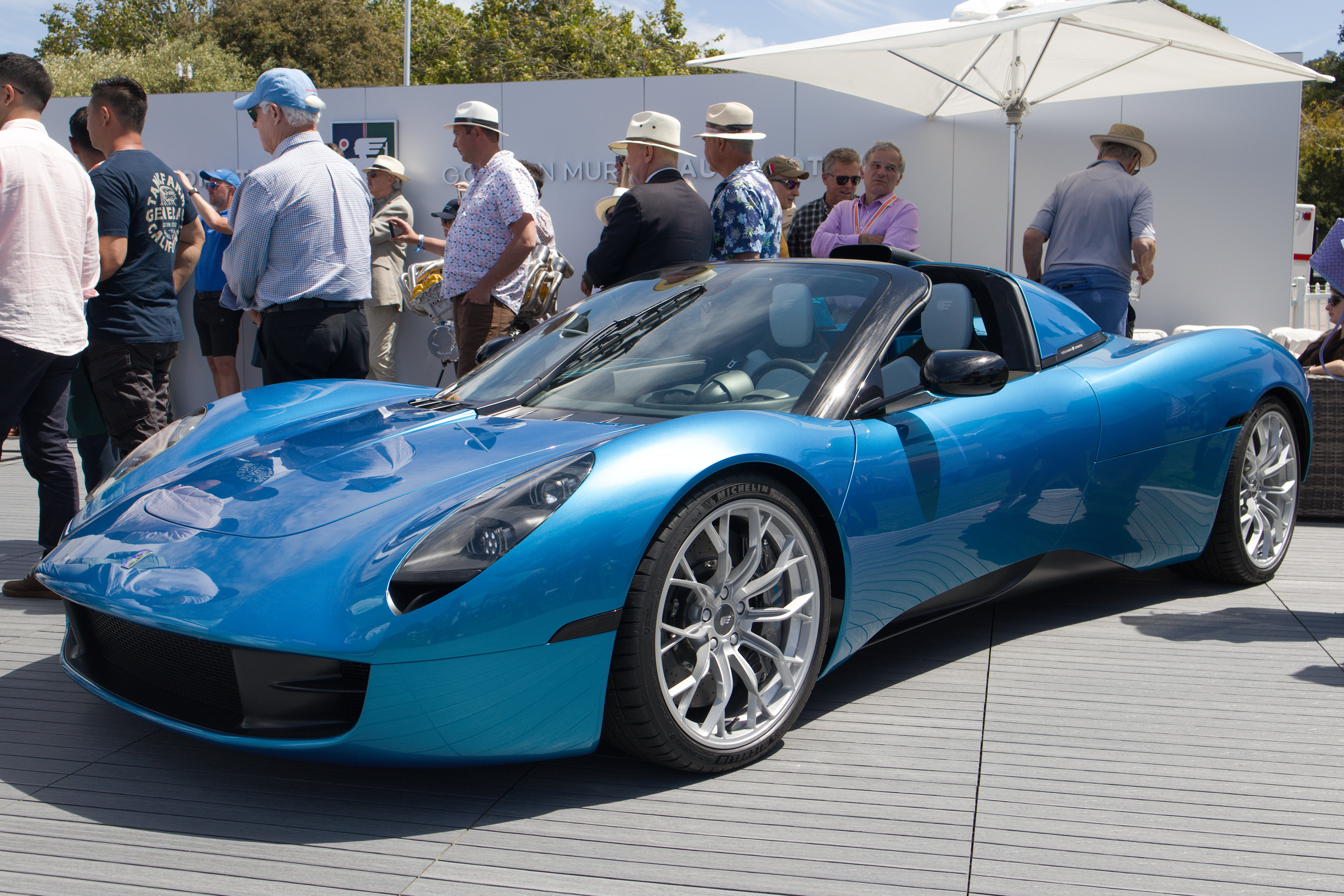
- GMA T.33 Spider

Overview
- Manufacturer: Gordon Murray Automotive
- Also called: GMA T.33
- Assembly: England: Dunsfold, Surrey (Gordon Murray Design Ltd)
- Designer: Gordon Murray

Body and chassis
- Class: Sports car (S)
- Body style: 2-door coupé; 2-door roadster (T.33 Spider)
- Layout: Rear mid-engine, rear-wheel-drive
- Doors: Butterfly
- Related: Gordon Murray Automotive T.50

Powertrain
- Engine: 4.0 L (3,994 cc) "3.9 L" Cosworth GMA.2 V12
- Power output: 615 PS (452 kW; 607 hp); 451 N⋅m (333 lbf⋅ft) of torque
- Transmission: 6-speed Xtrac H-pattern manual transmission

Dimensions
- Wheelbase: 2,736 mm (107.7 in)
- Length: 4,400 mm (173.2 in)
- Width: 1,850 mm (72.8 in)
- Height: 1,135 mm (44.7 in)
- Kerb weight: 1,090 kg (2,403 lb)

The Gordon Murray Automotive Type 33 or GMA T.33 is a sports car manufactured by Gordon Murray Automotive. Designed by Gordon Murray, the T.33 is the manufacturer's second model after the T.50 supercar.

== Design ==
The design of the GMA T.33 is claimed to be inspired by grand tourers of the 1960s, such as the Ferrari Dino and Lamborghini Miura. Murray utilized a 2-seater coupé configuration for the T.33, with the body built entirely in carbon fibre and mounted on a carbon fibre-and-aluminium frame. The T.33 has a luggage capacity of 280 litres (74 US gal), divided between a front trunk and two compartments ahead of the rear wheels.

The T.33 is powered by the same Cosworth V12 engine as the T.50, with 3.99 L (243 cu in) of displacement and four valves per cylinder. In the T.33, it is capable of 615 PS (452 kW; 607 bhp) at 10,500 rpm and 451 N⋅m (333 lb⋅ft) of torque at 9,500 rpm. Power is sent to the rear wheels via a standard 6-speed Xtrac manual transmission.

== Production ==
GMA plans to build 100 examples of each variant of the T.33 at its Surrey production site. Each car costs 1.37 million GBP before local taxes. In February 2022, it was reported that all 100 examples of the T.33 coupé had been sold.
