= Matrix (composite) =

Constituent of a composite material

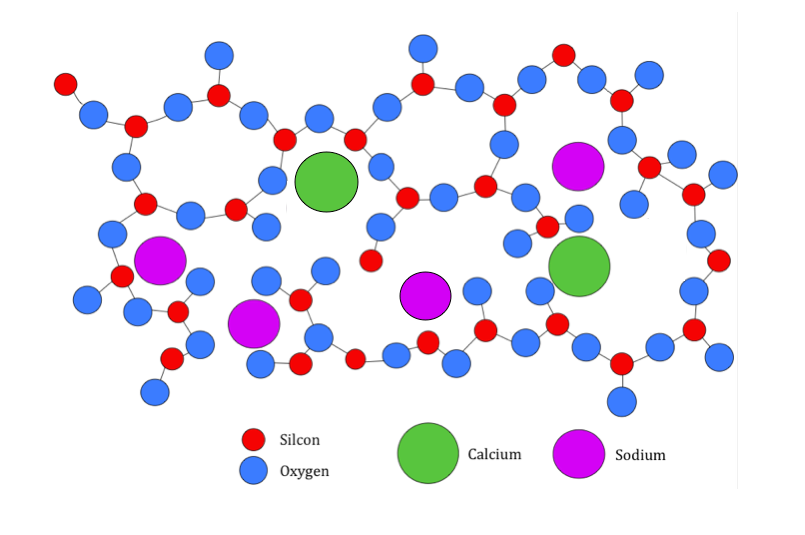
Structure of glass bead’s matrix, including interactions with ionic metals

In materials science, a matrix is a constituent of a composite material.

== Functions ==
A matrix serves the following functions:

- It binds the fiber reinforcement.
- It provides the composite component its shape and directs its surface quality.

== Organic Matrices ==
Traditional materials such as glues, muds have traditionally been used as matrices for adobe and papier-mâché.

The common matrices are polymers (mainly utilized for fibre reinforced plastics). The most common polymer-based composite materials which include carbon fibre, fibreglass and Kevlar, typically involve two parts at least, the resin and the substrate. Asphalt concrete, which is often used in the construction of roads, has a matrix called bitumen. Mud (wattle and daub) has observed considerable use.

Epoxy is utilized as a structural glue or structural matrix material in the aerospace industry. Epoxy resin is, when cured, nearly transparent.

Polyester resin is fit for most backyard projects. It tends to have a yellowish colour. It is often used in the construction of surfboards and for marine applications. They are usually coated as they can tend to deteriorate over time and sensitive to ultraviolet. Peroxide is considered as the hardener of polyester resin. Mostly, MEKP (methyl ethyl ketone peroxide) is considered for polyester resin. A curing reaction is initiated when the peroxide is combined with the resin, and decomposes to generate free radicals. In these systems, often hardeners are called catalysts. But they do not meet the strictest chemical definition of a catalyst as at the end of the reaction they do not re-appear unchanged.

Vinyl ester resin has a lower viscosity than polyester resin and is more transparent. It also tends to have a purplish to bluish to greenish tint. The price of the vinyl ester resin is similar to that of the polyester resin. It utilizes the same hardeners as polyester resin (at a similar mix ratio). It doesn't degrade much over time, when compared to polyester resin, and is more flexible. Generally, vinyl ester resin is considered as fuel resistant. However, it will melt when in contact with gasoline.

Shape memory polymer (SMP) resins are those materials that their shape and can be modified regularly by heating above their glass transition temperature (Tg). They become elastic and flexible when heated, allowing for easy configuration. They maintain their new shape when they are cooled. When they are reheated above their Tg, they will return to their original shape. The benefit of these resins is that without losing their material properties, they can be shaped and reshaped regularly. These resins can be utilized in making shape memory composites. Depending on their formulation, they have varying visual characteristics. These resins can be utilized in very cold temperature applications, such as for sensors that show whether perishable goods have warmed above a particular maximum temperature when they are acrylate-based; in space applications when they are cyanate-ester-based; in auto body and outdoor equipment repairs when they are epoxy-based.

== Inorganic Matrices ==
Cement (concrete), ceramics, sometimes glasses and metals are employed. Unusual matrices such as ice are sometimes proposed as in pykecrete.
