= Dymalloy =

Composite of copper, silver, and diamond

Dymalloy is a metal matrix composite of 20% copper and 80% silver alloy matrix with type I diamond. It has a very high thermal conductivity of 420 W/(m·K), and its thermal expansion can be adjusted to match other materials, such as the silicon and gallium arsenide used in computer chips. It is chiefly used in microelectronics as a substrate for high-power and high-density multi-chip modules, where it aids with removing waste heat.

Dymalloy was developed as part of CRADA between Sun Microsystems and Lawrence Livermore National Laboratory. It was first researched for use in space-based electronics for the Brilliant Pebbles project. Dymalloy is prepared from diamond powder of about 25 micrometers in size. The grains are coated by physical vapor deposition with a 10-nanometer-thick layer of alloy of tungsten with 26% rhenium, forming a tungsten carbide layer that assists bonding, then coated with 100 nanometers of copper to avoid carbide oxidation, then compacted in a mold and infiltrated with molten copper-silver alloy. Adding 55 vol.% of diamond yields a material whose thermal expansion matches that of gallium arsenide; a slightly higher amount of diamond allows matching to silicon. Copper can be used instead of copper-silver alloy, but the higher melting point may cause a partial transformation of diamond to graphite. The material shows some plasticity. High mechanical strain causes brittle failure in the diamond grains and ductile failure in the matrix. The diamond grains give the alloy a degree of surface texture; when a smooth surface is desired, the alloy can be plated and polished.

In 1996, the price for a 10×10×0.1 cm substrate was quoted as US$200.

Similar alloys are possible with the metal phase of one or more of silver, copper, gold, aluminium, magnesium, and zinc. The carbide-forming metal can be selected from titanium, zirconium, hafnium, vanadium, niobium, tantalum, and chromium, where Ti, Zr, and Hf are preferable. The amount of carbide-forming metal must be sufficient to coat at least 25% of the diamond grains, as otherwise, the bonding is insufficient, and the heat transfer between matrix and diamond grains is weak, which leads to loss of effectivity towards the level of the matrix metal alone. The material may deform at higher temperatures and must be low to prevent the formation of too thick a carbide layer that would hinder heat transfer. The volume of diamond should be higher than 30 vol.%, as a lower ratio does not provide a significant increase of thermal conductivity, and lower than 70 vol.% as a higher ratio of diamond makes thermal expansion matching to semiconductors difficult. The grains should also be surrounded with metal to avoid deformation due to different thermal expansion coefficients between diamond and metal; the carbide coating assists with this.

A similar material is AlSiC, with aluminium instead of copper-silver alloy and silicon carbide instead of diamond.
