= Metal injection molding =

Metalworking process in which finely-powdered metal is mixed with binder material

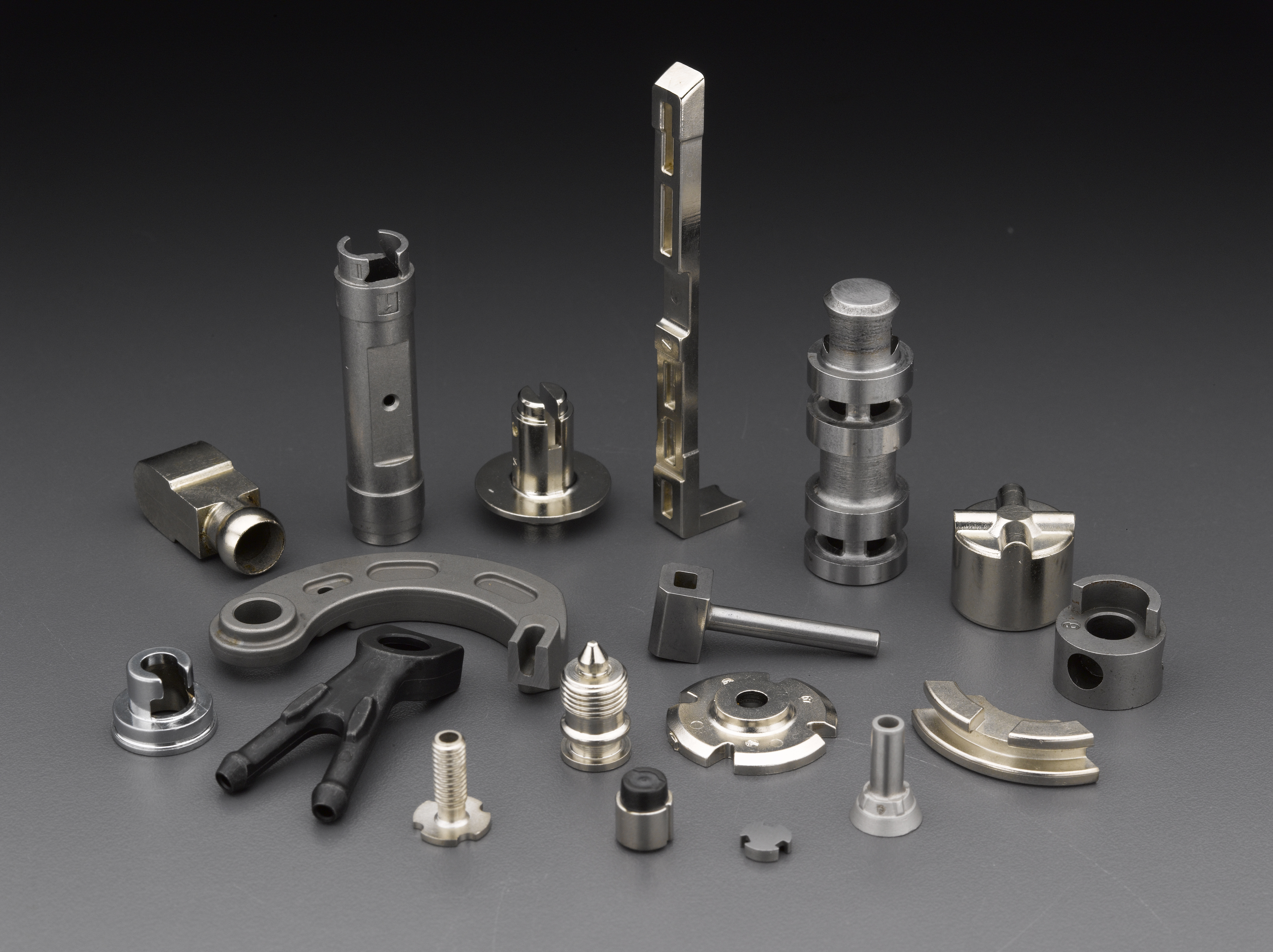
Metal parts produced by injection molding

Metal injection molding (MIM) is a metalworking process in which finely-powdered metal is mixed with binder material to create a "feedstock" that is then shaped and solidified using injection molding. Metal injection molding combines the most useful characteristics of powder metallurgy and plastic injection molding to facilitate the production of small, complex-shaped metal components with outstanding mechanical properties. The molding process allows high volume, complex parts to be shaped in a single step. After molding, the part undergoes conditioning operations to remove the binder (debinding) and densify the powders. Finished products are small components used in many industries and applications.

The behavior of MIM feedstock is governed by rheology, the study of sludges, suspensions, and other non-Newtonian fluids.

Due to current injection molding equipment limitations, products must be molded using quantities of 100 grams or less per "shot" into the mold. This shot can be distributed into multiple cavities, making MIM cost-effective for small, intricate, high-volume products, which would otherwise be expensive to produce. MIM feedstock can be composed of a plethora of metals, but most common are stainless steels, widely used in powder metallurgy. After the initial molding, the feedstock binder is removed, and the metal particles are diffusion bonded and densified to achieve the desired strength properties. The latter operation typically shrinks the product by 15% in each dimension.

The metal injection molding market has grown from US$9 million in 1986, to US$382 million in 2004 to more than US$1.5 billion in 2015. A related technology is ceramic powder injection molding, leading to about US$2 billion total sales. Most of the growth in recent years has been in Asia.

== Process ==
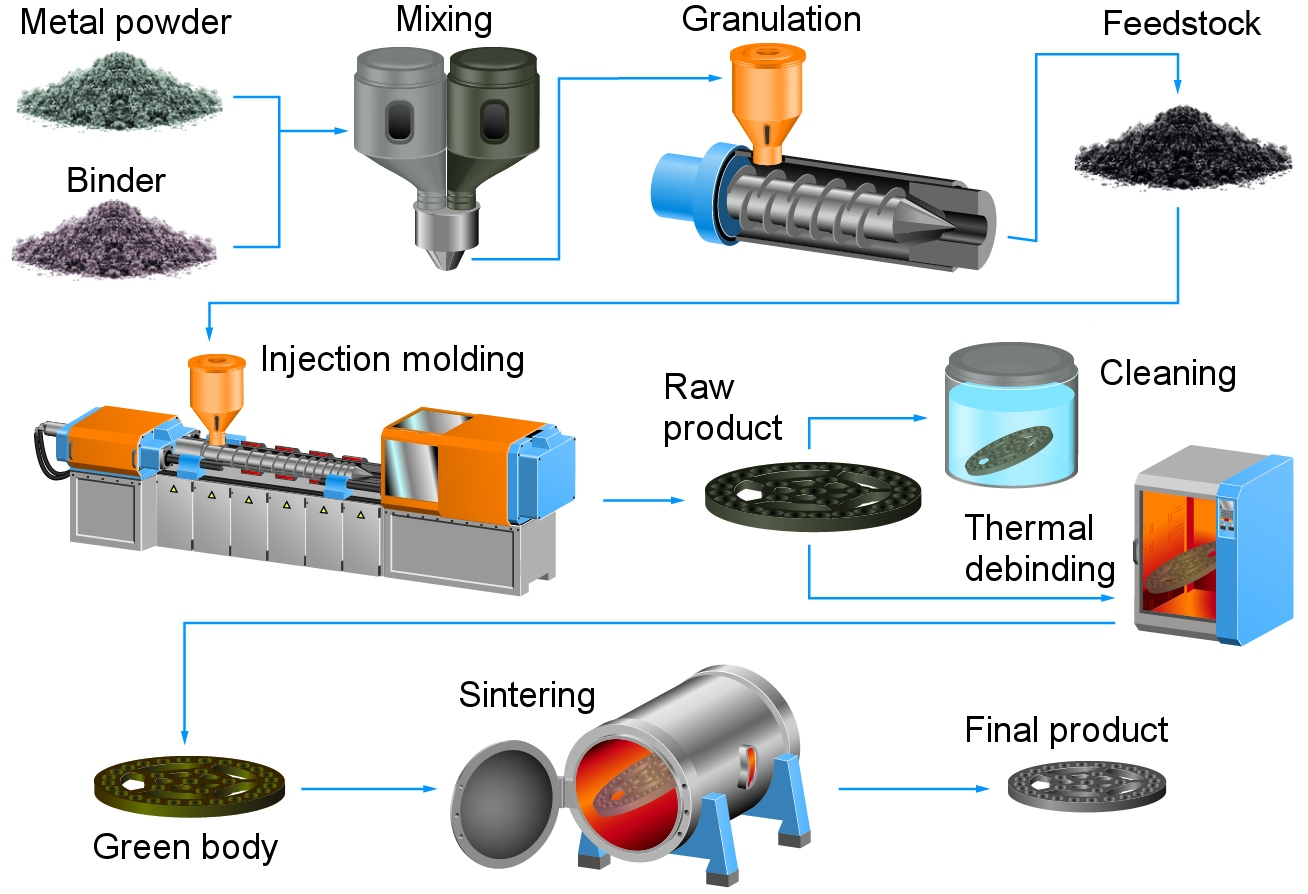
The powder injection molding process

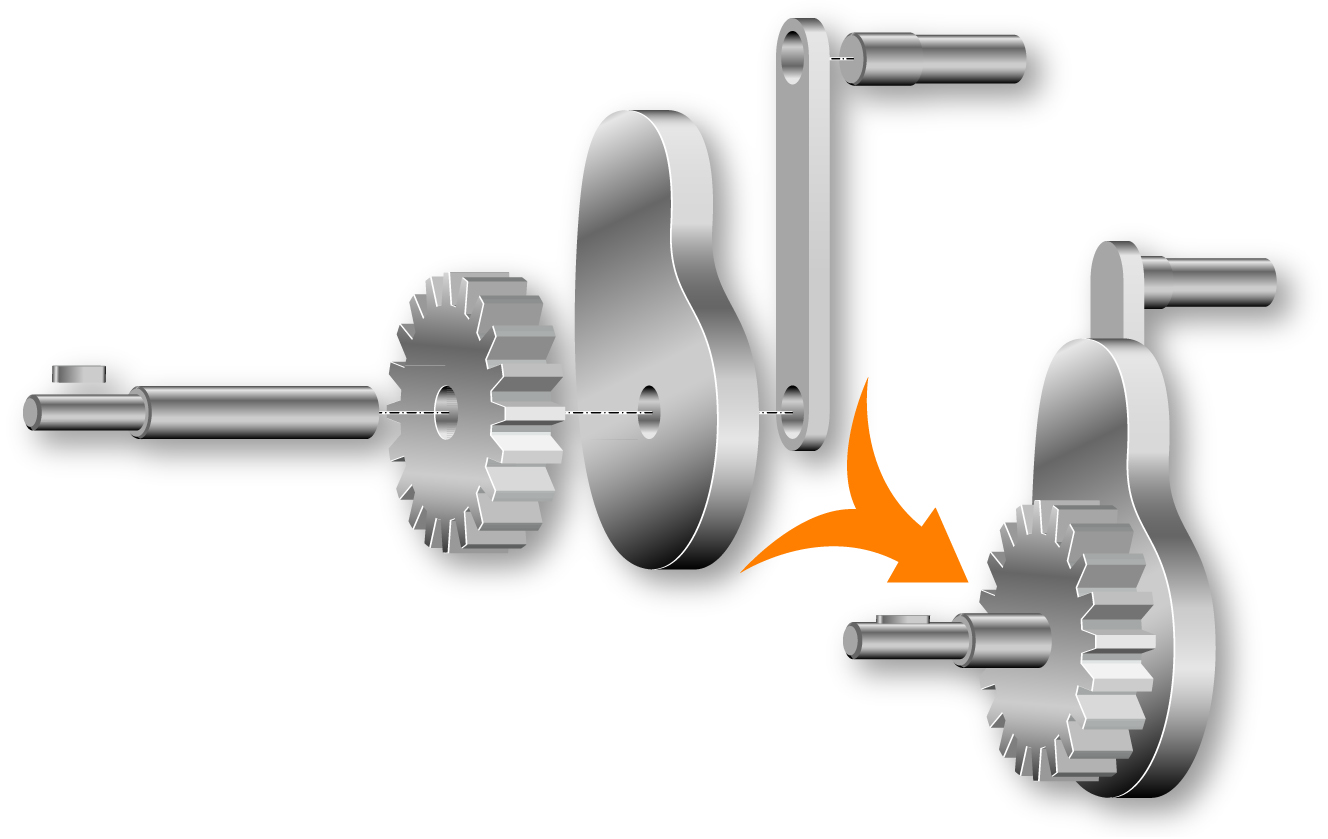
Complex geometry in one component instead of an assembly of many items

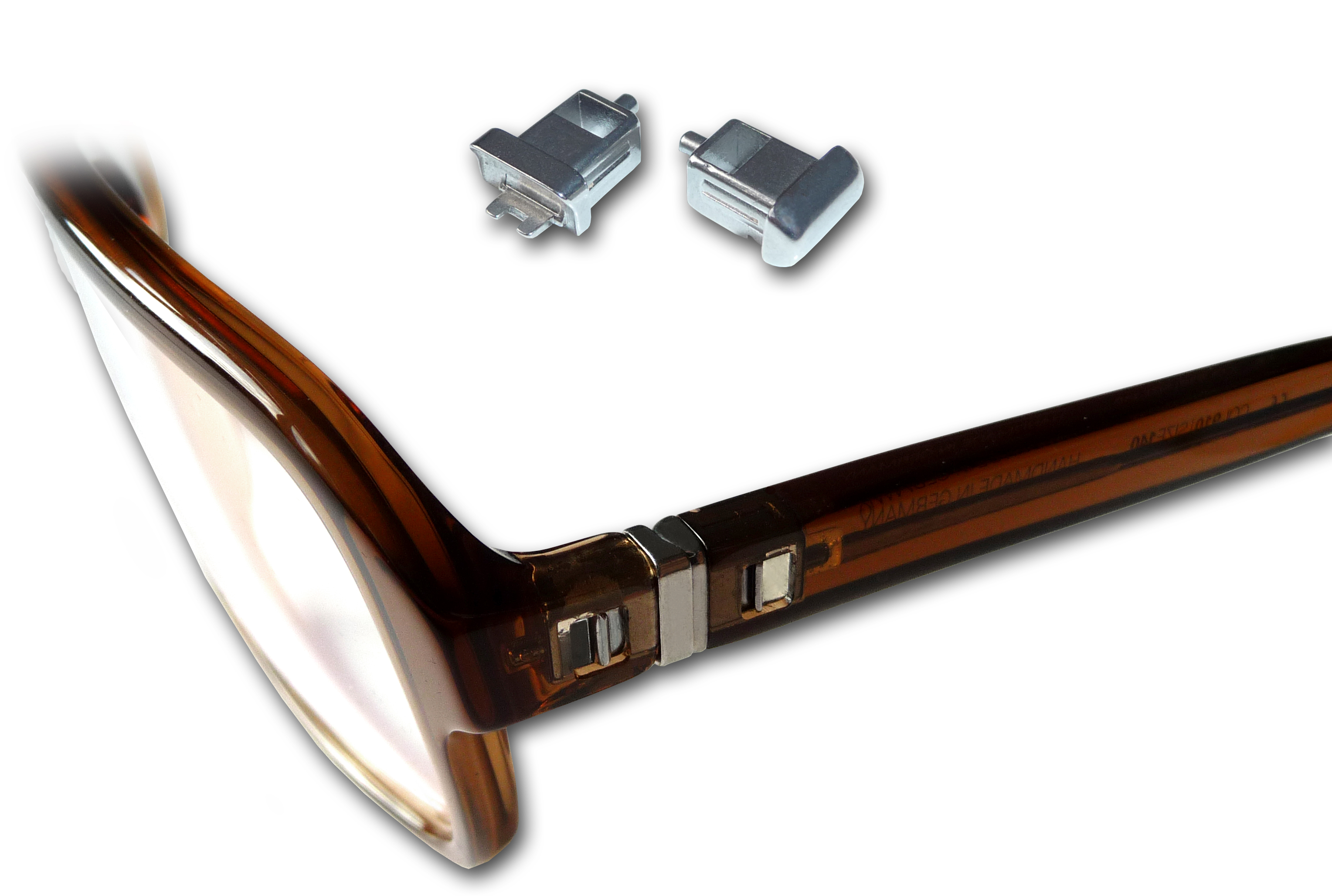
Eyeglass components produced by powder injection molding

In the monograph P.O. Gribovsky, published in 1956, he describes in detail the technology of hot casting (hot molding) ceramic products under pressure (now, Low Pressure Powder Injection Molding) and, in particular, notes that "hot casting technology provides the ability to manufacture products from any solid materials, ranging from natural minerals, pure oxides, carbides, metals, etc., and ending with multicomponent composite synthetic materials and their combinations". This indication of the possibility of MIM-casting, which was implemented by Dr. Raymond E. Wiech Jr. in the 1970s, who refined MIM technology as co-founder of a California company named Parmatech, the name being condensed from the phrase "particle materials technology". Wiech later patented his process, and it was widely adopted for manufacturing use in the 1980s.

MIM gained recognition throughout the 1990s as improvements to subsequent conditioning processes resulted in an end product that performs similarly to or better than those made through competing processes. MIM technology improved cost efficiency through high volume production to "net-shape", negating costly, additional operations such as machining although MIM is weak in terms of tight dimensional specifications.

The process steps involve combining metal powders with polymers such as wax and polypropylene binders to produce the "feedstock" mix that is injected as a liquid into a mold using plastic injection molding machines. The molded or "green part" is cooled and ejected from the mold. Next, a portion of the binder material is removed using solvent, thermal furnaces, catalytic process, or a combination of methods. The resulting, fragile and porous (40 volume percent "air") part, is in a condition called the "brown" stage. To improve handling often the debinding and sintering are combined into a single process. Sintering heats the powder to temperatures near the melting point in a protective atmosphere furnace to densify the particles using capillary forces in a process called sintering. MIM parts are often sintered at temperatures nearly high enough to induce partial melting in a process termed liquid phase sintering. For example, a stainless steel might be heated to 1,350 to 1,400 °C (2,460 to 2,550 °F). Diffusion rates are high leading to high shrinkage and densification. If performed in vacuum, it is common to reach 96–99% solid density. The end-product metal has comparable mechanical and physical properties with annealed parts made using classic metalworking methods. Post sintering heat treatments for MIM are the same as with other fabrication routes, and with high density the MIM component is compatible with the metal conditioning treatments such as plating, passivating, annealing, carburizing, nitriding, and precipitation hardening.

== Applications ==
The window of economic advantage in metal injection molded parts lies in complexity and volume for small-size parts. MIM materials are comparable to metal formed by competing methods, and final products are used in a broad range of industrial, commercial, medical, dental, firearms, aerospace, and automotive applications. Dimensional tolerances of ±0.3% are common and machining is required for closer tolerances. MIM can produce parts where it is difficult, or even impossible, to efficiently manufacture an item through other means of fabrication. Ideally, at least 75 dimensional specifications in a component of just 25 mm maximum size and 10 g mass is best – as for example required for watch cases, cellular telephone plugs, and laptop computer hinges. Increased costs for traditional manufacturing methods inherent to part complexity, such as internal/external threads, miniaturization, or identity marking, typically do not increase the cost in a MIM operation due to the flexibility of injection molding.

Other design capabilities that can be implemented into the MIM operation include product codes, part numbers, or date stamps; parts manufactured to their net weight reducing material waste and cost; Density controlled to within 95–99%; Amalgamation of parts and Complex 3D Geometries.

The ability to combine several operations into one process ensures MIM is successful in saving lead times as well as costs, providing significant benefits to manufacturers. The metal injection molding process might be a green technology due to the significant reduction in wastage compared to "traditional" manufacturing methods such as 5 axis CNC machining. However, some of the older operations generate toxic emissions such as formaldehyde, dispose of chlorinated solvents, and must burn off wax or other polymers, leading to greenhouse gas emissions.

There is a broad range of materials available when utilizing the MIM process. Traditional metalworking processes often involve a significant amount of material waste, which makes MIM a highly efficient option for the fabrication of complex components consisting of expensive/special alloys (cobalt-chrome, 17-4 PH stainless steel, titanium alloys and tungsten carbides). MIM is a viable option when extremely thin walls specifications (i.e., 100 micrometers) are required. Additionally, electromagnetic interference shielding requirements have presented unique challenges, which are being successfully attained through the utilization of specialty alloys (ASTM A753 Type 4).

== Advantages ==
- Can manufacture metal powder products with high density (99%) and good surface roughness (1μm Ra).
- Allows the freedom to manufacture complicated shapes that would be considered cost prohibitive by other methods.
- Provides for the manufacture of micro-sized parts in high volumes.
- Achieves net shape features such as internal and external threads, profiled holes and finely detailed surface textures, knurling, engravings and markings.

== Disadvantages ==
Although MIM has many advantages, it also has some disadvantages:

- Higher initial cost: High initial investment is required due to tool manufacturing costs and raw materials costs.
- Limitation of Size: MIM is very good for smaller parts but it is not suitable for the manufacture of parts of more than 20 cm.
- Quantity: MIM is only suitable for high quantity runs.

== See also ==
Die casting
