= Toughening =

In materials science, toughening refers to the process of making a material more resistant to the propagation of cracks. When a crack propagates, the associated irreversible work in different materials classes is different. Thus, the most effective toughening mechanisms differ among different materials classes. The crack tip plasticity is important in toughening of metals and long-chain polymers. Ceramics have limited crack tip plasticity and primarily rely on different toughening mechanisms.

== Toughening in metals ==
For the case of a ductile material such as a metal, this toughness is typically proportional to the fracture stress and strain as well as the gauge length of the crack. The plane strain toughness in a metal is given by:

$$G_{\Iota C} = B\sigma_{yf}\epsilon_{fr}\rho$$

where $G_{\Iota C}$ is the plane strain toughness, $B$ is a constant that incorporates the stress state, $\sigma_{yf}$ is the tensile flow stress at fracture, $\epsilon_{fr}$ is the tensile fracture strain, and $\rho$ is the radius of crack tip.

In a low yield strength material, the crack tip can be blunted easily and larger crack tip radius is formed. Thus, in a given metallic alloy, toughness in a low-strength condition is usually higher than for higher strength conditions because less plasticity is available for toughening. Therefore, some safety-critical structural part such as pressure vessels and pipelines to aluminum alloy air frames are manufactured in relatively low strength version. Nonetheless, toughness should be improved without sacrificing its strength in metal. Designing a new alloy or improving its processing can achieve this goal.

Designing a new alloy can be explained by different toughness in several ferrous alloy.18%Ni-maraging steel has a higher toughness than the martensitic steel AISI 4340. In an AISI 4340 alloy, interstitial carbon exist in a bcc (body centered cubic) matrix and show an adverse effect on toughness. In 18%Ni-maraging steel, the carbon content is lower and martensite is strengthened by substitutional Ni atoms. In addition, transformation induced plasticity (TRIP) effects in steel can provide additional toughness. In TRIP steel, matrix is metastable and can be transformed to martensite during deformation. The work associated to phase transformation contributes to the improvement of toughness. In a monolithic Pd–Ag–P–Si–Ge glass alloy, the properties of high bulk modulus and low shear modulus lead to proliferation of shear bands. These bands are self constrained and the toughness is improved.

Metals can be toughened by improvement of processing. With a high affinity for oxygen, titanium alloy can absorb oxygen easily. Oxygen can promote the formation of α_{2} phase. These coherent α_{2} particles lead to easy crack nucleation and fast crack propagation within the planar slip bands. Therefore, toughness of titanium alloy is decreased. Multiple vacuum arc melting (VAR) technique can be used to minimize the oxygen content and increase the toughness of the alloy. Similarly, phosphorus in steels can decrease toughness dramatically. Phosphorus can segregate on grain boundary and lead to intergranular fracture. If the dephosphorization is improved during steelmaking, the steel will be toughened for a lower phosphorus content. After appropriate processing of steel, crystalline grains and second phases that are oriented along rolling direction can improve toughness of materials by delamination which can relax triaxial stress and blunt the crack tip.

Metals can also be strengthened by the methods described below for ceramics, but these methods generally have a lesser impact on toughening than plasticity induced crack blunting.

== Toughening in ceramics ==
Ceramics are more brittle than most metals and plastics. The irreversible work associated with plastic deformation is not presented in ceramics. Hence, the methods that improve the toughness of ceramics are different from metals. There are several toughening mechanisms called crack deflection, microcrack toughening, transformation toughening, and crack bridging.

Common toughening mechanisms

=== Crack deflection ===
In polycrystalline ceramics, the crack can propagate in an intergranular way. The associated irreversible work per unit area is 2γ-γ_{gb}, where γ is the surface energy of material and γ_{gb} is the grain boundary energy. Though the irreversible work is decreased because of grain boundary energy, the fracture area is increased in intergranular crack propagation. Moreover, Mode II crack can be caused by deflection from normal fracture plane during intergranular crack propagation, which furtherly improves the toughness of ceramics. As a result, the ceramics with intergranular fracture shows a higher toughness than that with transgranular fracture. In SiC, the fracture toughness is ~2-3 $MPa \cdot m^{0.5}$ if it fractures transgranularly and the fracture toughness is improved to 10 $MPa \cdot m^{0.5}$ when it fractures intergranularly. Crack deflection mechanisms bring about increased toughness in ceramics exhibiting abnormal grain growth (AGG). The heterogeneous microstructures produced by AGG form materials that can be considered as “in-situ composites” or “self-reinforced materials. Crack deflections around second phase particles have also been used in fracture mechanics approaches to predict fracture toughness increases.

=== Microcrack toughening ===
Microcrack toughening means that the formation of microcracks before the main crack can toughen the ceramic. Additional microcracks will cause stress to concentrate in front of the main crack. This leads to additional irreversible work required for crack propagation. In addition, these microcracks can cause crack branches, and one crack can form multiple cracks. Because of the formation of these cracks, irreversible work is increased. The increment of toughness $G_{C}$ due to microcrack toughening can be expressed by:

$\Delta G_{C} \cong 2r_c\sigma_{R}(\Delta\alpha)(\Delta T)V_f$

where $r_c$ is the distance between microcracks and fracture plane, $\sigma_{R}$ is residual stress, $\Delta\alpha$ is the difference of thermal expansion coefficient between adjacent grains, $\Delta T$ is the temperature difference causing thermal strain, and $V_f$ is the fraction of grains that is related to microcracks in an affected volume. In this equation, it has been assumed that residual stress is dominant in nucleating microcracks and formation of microcracks is caused by elastic work. In order to retard crack propagation, these microcracks must form during crack propagation. The grain size should be smaller than a critical grain size to avoid spontaneous formation of microcracks. The distance between microcrack and fracture plane should be larger than grain size to have a toughening effect. As demonstrated most prominently by Katherine Faber in 1981, the toughening induced by the incorporation of second-phase particles subject to microcracking becomes appreciable for a narrow size distribution of particles of appropriate size.

=== Transformation toughening ===
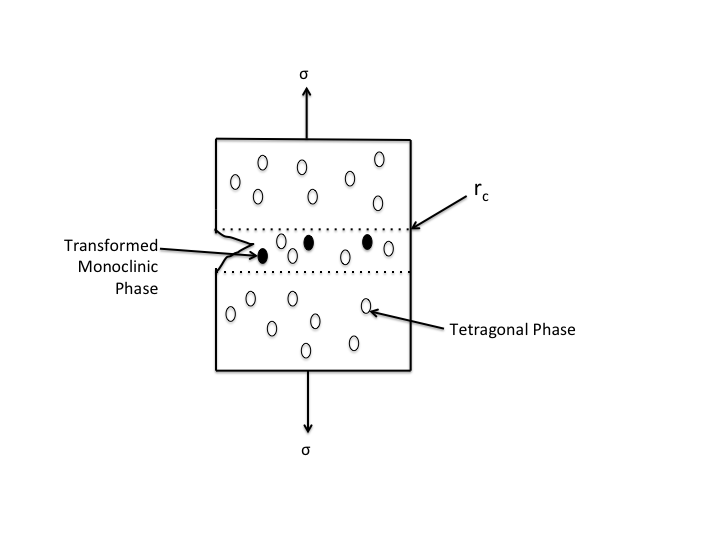
Schematic of transformation toughening in partially stabilized zirconia

The TRIP effect is found in partially stabilized zirconia. Partially stabilized zirconia is composed of tetragonal phase at high temperature and monoclinic phase and cubic phase at lower temperature in equilibrium. In some components, the onset temperature of tetragonal monoclinic martensite transformation is lower than room temperature. The stress field near the crack tip triggers the martensitic transformation at velocities hypothesized to approach that of sound in the material. The martensitic transformation causes volume expansion (volumetric/ dilatational strain) and shear strains of about 4% and 16% respectively. It applies compressive stress at the crack tip to prevent crack propagation as well as closure tractions at the crack wake. From another point of view, the work associated to this phase transformation contributes to the improvement of toughness. The increment of toughness caused by transformation toughening can be expressed by:

$\Delta G_{C} \cong 2r_c\sigma_{M}\epsilon_M V_f$

where $r_c$ is the distance between boundary of transformed region with fracture plane, $\sigma_{M}$ is the stress triggering martensite transformation, $\epsilon_M$ is the strain of martensite transformation, and $V_f$ is the fraction of tetragonal grains that is related to microcracks in an affected volume. The tetragonal particle size should be controlled properly. It is due to that too large particle size leads to spontaneous transformation and too small particle size leads to a very small toughening effect.

=== Crack bridging ===
When a crack propagates in an irregular path, some grains of each side of main crack may protrude into other side. This leads to additional work for a complete fracture. This irreversible work is related to residual stress, which is about . The increment of toughness can be expressed by:

$\Delta G_{C} \cong {1\over 8}\mu\sigma_{R} V_f d$

where $\mu$ is the coefficient of friction, $\sigma_{R}$ is residual stress, $d$ is the edge length of grain, and $V_f$ is the fraction of grains associated with crack bridging.

There are some other approaches to improve the toughness of ceramics through crack bridging. The phenomenon of abnormal grain growth, or AGG, can be harnessed to impart a crack bridging microstructure within a single phase ceramic material. The presence of abnormally long grains serves to bridge crack-wakes and hinders their opening. This has been demonstrated in silicon carbide and silicon nitride. Abnormally large grains may also serve to toughen ceramics through crack deflection mechanisms. Formation of a textured internal structure within ceramics can be used as a toughening approach. silicon carbide materials have toughened by this approach. Because the interfacial surface area is increased due to the internal structure, the irreversible fracture work is increased in this material.

Schematic fiber-reinforced composites

== Toughening in composites ==
In metal matrix composites (MMCs), the additions strengthen the metal and reduce the toughness of material. In ceramic matrix composites (CMCs), the additions can toughen materials but not strengthen them. at same time. In carbon fiber reinforced composites (CFRPs), graphite fibers can toughen and strengthen polymer at same time. In bulk metallic glass composites(BMGs), dendrites are added to hind the movement of shear band and the toughness is improved.

If fibers have larger fracture strain than matrix, the composite is toughened by crack bridging. The toughness of a composite can be expressed:

$G_{C}= V_m G_{m}+V_f G_{f}+\Delta G_{C}$

where $G_{ m}$ and $G_{f}$ are toughness of matrix and fibers respectively, $V_{ m}$ and $V_{ f}$ are volume of matrix and fibers respectively, $\Delta G_{C}$ is the additional toughness caused by bridging toughening. After crack propagates across through fiber, the fiber is elongated and is pulled out from matrix. These processes correspond to plastic deformation and pull-out work and contribute to toughening of composite.

When fiber is brittle, the pull-out work dominates the irreversible work contributing to toughening. The increment of toughness caused by pull-out work can be expressed by:

$\Delta G_{C} = {1\over 32}{\beta^2\sigma_{f}^2 V_f d \over \tau}$

where $\beta$ is the ratio between debond length and critical length, $\sigma_{f}$ is the strength of fibers, $d$ is the width of fiber, $V_f$ is the fraction of fibers and $\tau$ is the interface friction stress. From the equation, it can be found that higher volume fraction, higher fiber strength and lower interfacial stress can get a better toughening effect.

=== Ductile phase crack bridging ===
When fiber is ductile, the work from plastic deformation mainly contributes to the improvement of toughens. The additional toughness contributed by plastic deformation can be expressed by:

$\Delta G_{C} = C\sigma_{y}\epsilon_f V_f l_d$

where $C$ is a constant between 1.5-6, $\sigma_{y}$ is the flow stress of fibers, $\epsilon_{y}$ is the fracture strain of fibers, $V_f$ is the fraction of fibers, and $l_d$ is the debond length. From the equation, it can be found that higher flow stress and longer debond length can improve the toughening. However, longer debond length usually lead to a decrease of flow stress because of loss of constraint for plastic deformation.

The toughness in a composite with ductile phase toughening can also be shown using stress intensity factor, $K_c$ by linear superposition of the matrix and crack bridging based on solutions by Tada. This model can predict behavior for small-scale bridging (bridge length << crack length) under monotonic loading conditions, but not large scale bridging.

$K_c = K_m + \Delta K_b = K_m + \sqrt{\frac{2}{\pi}}\alpha V_f\int_{0}^{L}\frac{\sigma_y}{\sqrt{x}}dx$

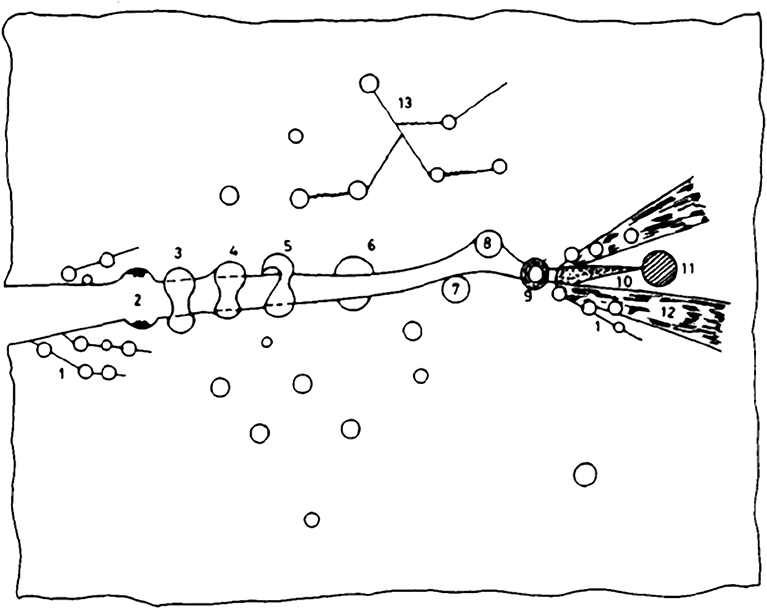
Several toughening mechanism in epoxies

where $K_m$ is the fracture toughness of the matrix, $\Delta K_b$ is the toughening due to crack bridging, $L$ is the bridge length, $x$ is the distance behind the crack tip, $\sigma_y$ is the uniaxial yield stress, and $\alpha$ is a constraint/ triaxiality factor.

== Toughening in polymers ==
Toughening mechanisms in polymers are similar with that have been discussed above. There are only several examples are used to explain the toughening in polymers. In high-impact polystyrene (HIPS), the elastomeric dispersion is used to improve crack propagation resistance. When main crack propagates, microcracks form around elastomeric dispersion above or below the fracture plane. The HIPS is toughened by additional work associated with formation of microcracks. In epoxies, glass particles are used to improve toughness of materials. The toughening mechanism is similar with crack deflection. The addition of plasticizers in polymers is also a good way to improve its toughness.
