= Katherine Faber =

American materials scientist

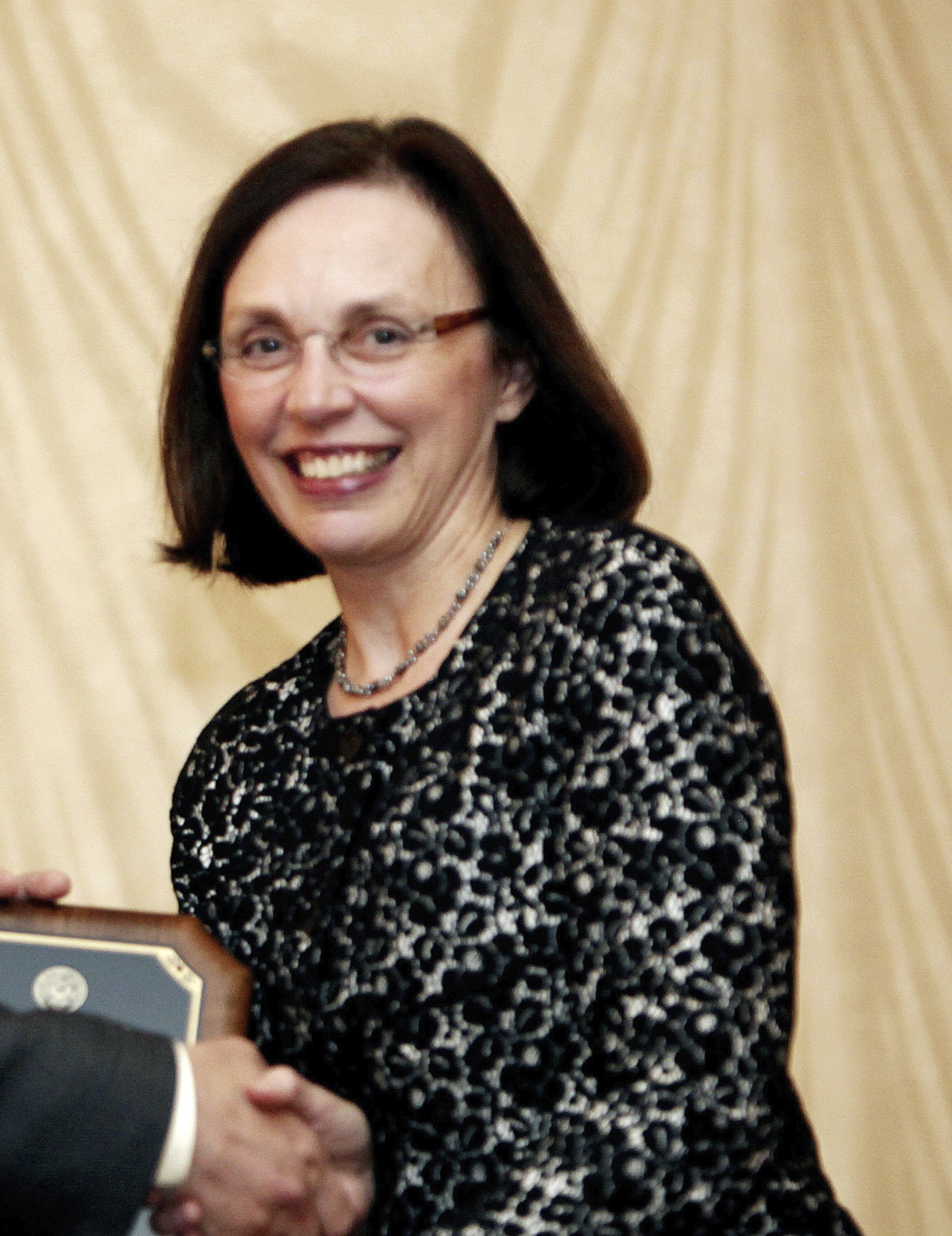
- Faber at the McCormick School of Engineering at Northwestern University
- Born: Katherine Theresa Faber; June 19, 1953 (age 73); Buffalo, New York, U.S.
- Education: Alfred University (BS); Pennsylvania State University (MS); University of California, Berkeley (PhD)
- Spouse: Thomas Felix Rosenbaum
- Scientific career
- Fields: Materials science; Porous mediums; Ceramics; Composite materials
- Workplaces: Ohio State University; Northwestern University; California Institute of Technology
- Thesis: Toughening of ceramic materials by crack deflection processes (1982)
- Doctoral advisor: Anthony G. Evans

Katherine Theresa Faber is an American materials scientist and one of the world's foremost experts in ceramic engineering, material strengthening, and ultra-high temperature materials. Faber is the Simon Ramo Professor of Materials Science at the California Institute of Technology (Caltech). She was previously the Walter P. Murphy Professor and department chair of Materials Science and Engineering at the McCormick School of Engineering at Northwestern University.

Faber is known for her work in the fracture mechanics of brittle materials and energy-related ceramics and composites, including the Faber-Evans model of crack deflection, which is named after her research discoveries. Her research encompasses a broad range of topics, from ceramics for thermal and environmental barrier coatings in power generation components to porous solids for filters and flow in medical applications. Faber is the co-founder and previous co-director of the Center for Scientific Studies in the Arts and also oversees a number of collaborative endeavors, especially with NASA's Jet Propulsion Laboratory.

== Biography ==
=== Early life and education ===
Faber was uniquely fascinated by science from a young age, and her father in particular was supportive of her working toward a higher education in engineering. An initial interest in chemistry evolved to an appreciation for ceramic engineering after Faber recognized its potential in solving many engineering problems. Faber obtained her Bachelor of Science in Ceramic Engineering at the New York State College of Ceramics within Alfred University (1975). She later completed her Master of Science in Ceramic Science at Penn State University (1978) where she studied phase separation in glasses with Professor Guy Rindone. After graduating with her MS, she worked for a year as a development engineer for The Carborundum Company in Niagara Falls, New York, on the development of silicon carbide for high performance applications such as engines. Following her year in industry, Faber decided to pursue a PhD in materials science at the University of California, Berkeley, which she completed in 1982.

=== Teaching, Recognition, and Awards ===
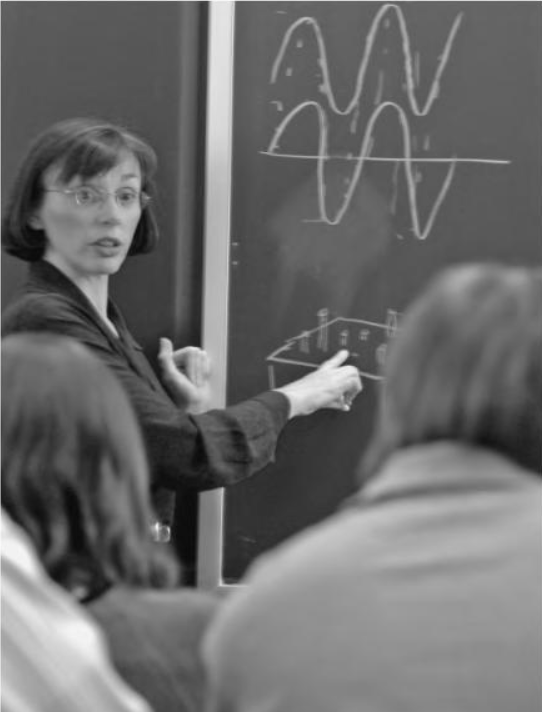
Katherine Faber lecturing on mechanical behavior of solids

From 1982 to 1987, Faber served as Assistant and associate professor of Ceramic Engineering at the Ohio State University. She participated in the first class of the Defense Science Study Group, a program which introduces outstanding American science and engineering professors to the United States' security challenges (1985–1988). From 1988 to 2014, she taught as associate professor, professor, and Walter P. Murphy Professor of Materials Science and Engineering at the McCormick School of Engineering at Northwestern University. During her time at Northwestern, she served as the Associate Dean for Graduate Studies and Research, overseeing more than $25 million in faculty research funds. She went on to complete a 5-year term as department chair of Materials Science and Engineering at Northwestern, where she also served as the Chair of the University Materials Council (2001–2002), a collaborative group composed of directors of a number of materials programs from across the US and Canada. Additionally, from 2005 to 2007 she sat on the Scientific Advisory Committee of the Advanced Photon Source at Argonne National Lab. In 2014, she joined the teaching faculty at Caltech.

From 2006 to 2007, Faber served as the President of the American Ceramic Society, and in 2013 was named a Distinguished Life Member in recognition of her notable contributions to the ceramic and glass profession. In 2014, Faber was elected to the American Academy of Arts and Sciences class of fellows for work in preserving material culture. In 2024, Faber received the W. David Kingery Award, one of the highest honors bestowed in the ceramics community, for her lifelong contributions to ceramic technology and education.

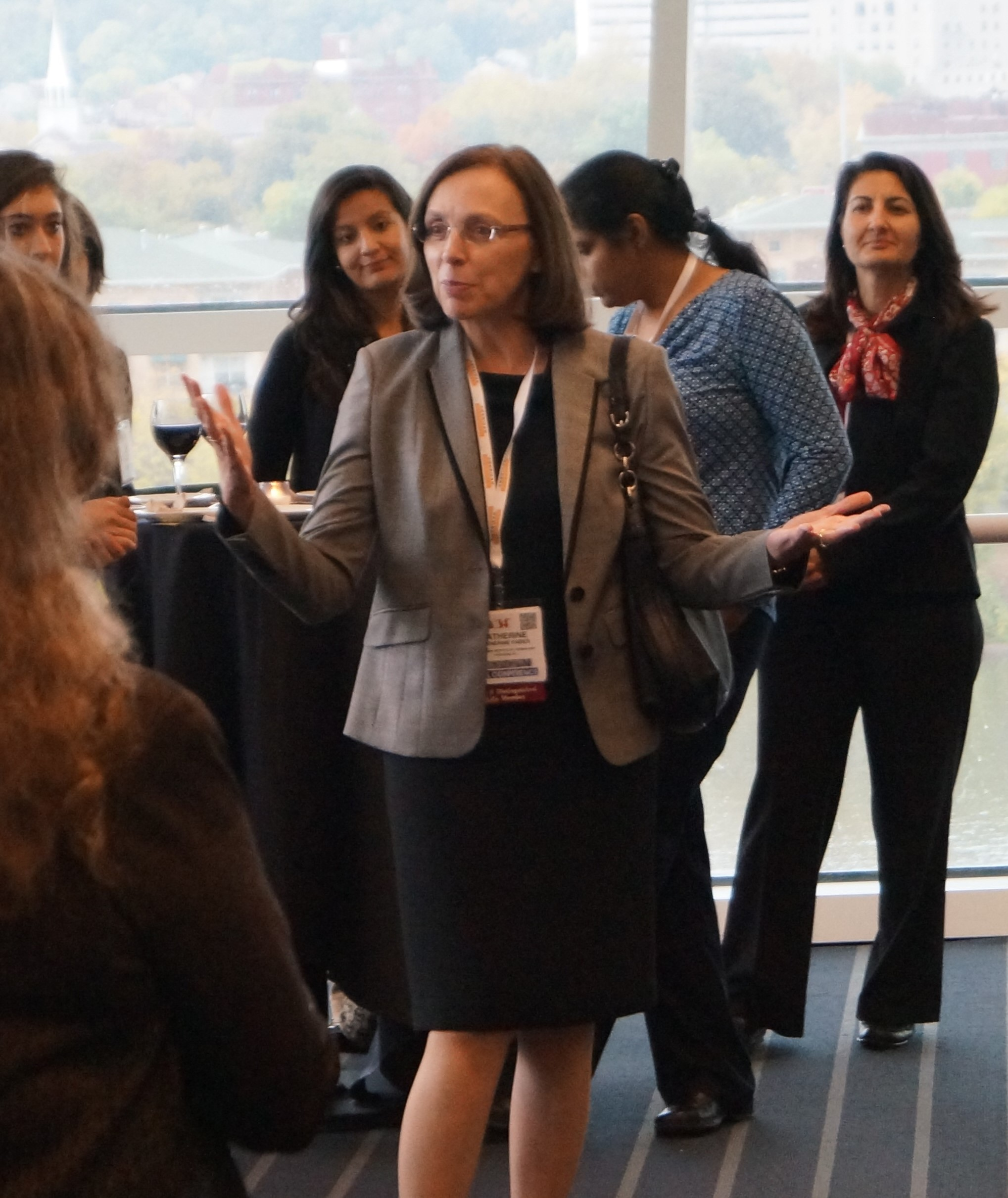
Faber at the WiMSE Reception

She has also been recognized and awarded with:

- IBM faculty development award (1984–1986)
- National Science Foundation (NSF) Presidential Young Investigator Award (1984–1989)
- Society of Women Engineers Distinguished Educator Award (1995)
- YWCA Achievement Award for Education (1997)
- NSF Creativity Extension Award (2001–2003)
- Fellowship in ASM International (2003)
- Pennsylvania State University College of Earth and Mineral Sciences Charles L. Hosler Alumni Scholar Medal (2004)
- NSF American Competitiveness and Innovation Fellow and Creativity Extension Award (2010)
- Toledo Glass and Ceramics Award, Michigan/Northwest Ohio Section of the American Ceramic Society (2012)
- American Academy of Arts and Sciences (2014)
- American Ceramic Society John Jeppson Award (2015)
- W. David Kingery Award (2024)

== Work ==
=== Research ===
Katherine Faber's research encompasses a diverse range of material science topics, focusing on fracture mechanics, shape memory materials, environmental barrier coatings (EBCs), additive manufacturing, boron nitride composites, and historical ceramics. Her work on shape memory materials investigates the martensitic transformation in zirconia-based ceramics. Using freeze-casting techniques, Faber's research group creates porous zirconia structures exhibiting shape memory behaviors. Through sol-gel synthesis and freeze-casting, she examines stress-induced shape memory and superelastic effects in oligocrystalline zirconia systems, addressing the volume change issue that causes premature cracking in bulk systems.

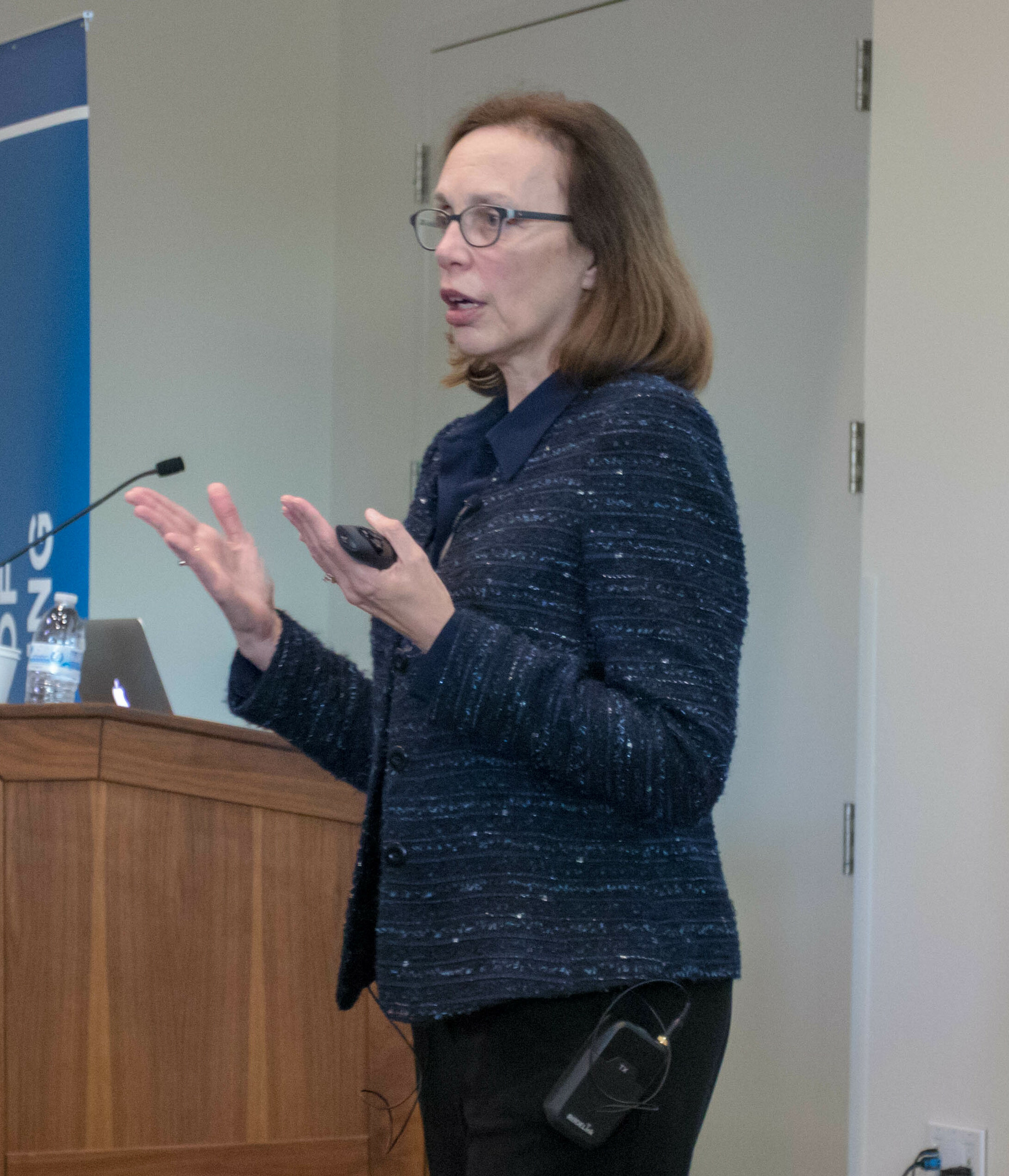
Distinguished Lecture by Dr. Katherine Faber at UC Davis College of Engineering, Winter 2018

Faber also explores the durability of environmental barrier coatings (EBCs) in high-temperature applications, such as gas turbine engines. EBCs are essential for protecting ceramic matrix composites (CMCs) from degradation in combustion environments. Her research delves into the damage modes, including oxidation of the bond coat layer and the mismatch of thermal expansion coefficients, which lead to cracking and spalling. Faber employs advanced techniques like high-intensity X-rays at the Advanced Photon Source (APS) to measure internal strains, stresses, and damage evolution in EBC systems, aiming to understand the mechanisms and rates of oxidation failure and enhance the lifetime of these coatings.

In collaboration with NASA's Jet Propulsion Laboratory, Faber works on advancing Hall-effect thrusters by developing a composite material that combines hexagonal boron nitride (h-BN) and graphite. The brittle nature of bulk BN poses challenges under dynamic loads, prompting Faber's group to create a layered system where h-BN is grown on graphite through high-temperature carbothermal reduction. This composite material combines the desirable properties of both components, offering thermal emissivity, chemical inertness, and resistance to thermal shock while addressing the issues of oxidation and brittleness in dynamic environments.

Faber's research group also examines historical ceramics, specifically Meissen porcelain, to understand and authenticate Böttger lusterware. Using scientific methods such as X-ray diffraction, scanning electron microscopy, and chemical characterization, her group investigates the composition and manufacturing techniques of lusterware. By reverse-engineering these historical artifacts, her research provides insights into the materials and processes used in early 18th-century Meissen factories, contributing to the historical knowledge and preservation of these significant cultural artifacts. Her research interests also include silicon-based ceramics and ceramic matrix composites; polymer-derived multifunctional ceramics; graphite- and silicon carbide-based cellular ceramics synthesized from natural scaffolds, such as pyrolyzed wood; and cultural heritage science, with emphasis on porcelains and jades.

==== Crack Deflection Model ====
Main Article: Faber-Evans model

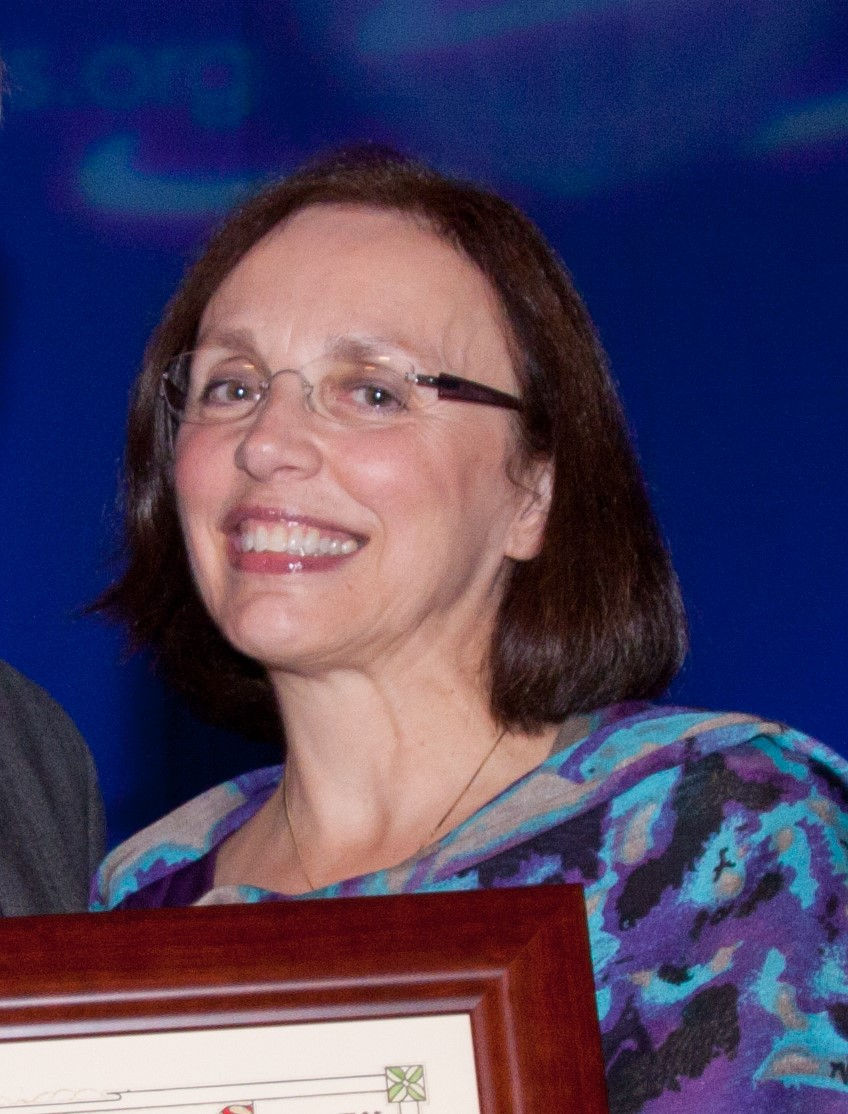
Katherine Faber at the 2013 ACS Awards

Katherine Faber and her PhD advisor, Anthony G. Evans, first introduced a materials of mechanics model designed to predict the enhancement of fracture toughness in ceramics. This is achieved by accounting for crack deflection around second-phase particles prone to microcracking within a matrix. The model considers particle morphology, aspect ratio, spacing, and volume fraction of the second phase. Additionally, it accounts for the decrease in local stress intensity at the crack tip when deflection or bowing of the crack plane occurs.

Faber showed that by using imaging techniques, the actual crack tortuosity can be determined, enabling the direct input of deflection and bowing angles into the model. The subsequent rise in fracture toughness is then contrasted with that of a flat crack in a plain matrix. The degree of toughening hinges on the mismatch strain resulting from thermal contraction incompatibility and the microfracture resistance at the particle/matrix interface. This toughening effect becomes prominent when particles exhibit a narrow size distribution and are suitably sized.

Faber's analysis revealed that fracture toughness, regardless of morphology, is primarily determined by the most severe twisting of the crack front rather than its initial inclination. While the initial tilting of the crack front contributes to significant toughening in the case of disc-shaped particles, the twist component remains the dominant factor in enhancing toughness. Additionally, she showed that the distribution of inter-particle spacing plays a crucial role in the toughening effect of spherical particles. Specifically, the toughness increases when spheres are in close proximity, causing twist angles to approach π/2. These insights by Faber formed the foundation for designing stronger two-phase ceramic materials. The Faber-Evans model is widely used by materials scientists to indicate that materials with approximately equiaxial grains can experience a fracture toughness increase of about twice the grain boundary value due to deflection effects.

=== Initiatives ===
Faber is the co-founder and co-director of the Northwestern University–Art Institute of Chicago Center for Scientific Studies in the Arts (NU-ACCESS), a collaboration between Northwestern University and the Art Institute of Chicago in which advanced materials characterization and analytical techniques are used to further conservation science for historical artifacts. NU-ACCESS, the first center of its kind, provides opportunities for scientists and scholars from a variety of institutions to make use of the center's facilities to study their collections.

== Personal life ==
Faber is married to condensed matter physicist, and former president of the California Institute of Technology, Thomas F. Rosenbaum. They began their careers at the California Institute of Technology in 2013 after Rosenbaum transitioned from his previous position as the John T. Wilson Distinguished Service Professor of Physics and university provost of The University of Chicago. Together, they have two sons.

== See also ==
- Faber-Evans model
- Ceramic engineering
- Fracture Mechanics
- Fracture toughness
- Toughening
- Women In Engineering
- Material Science
- Aerospace Engineering

== Selected publications ==
Faber has authored over 150 papers, written three book chapters, and edited a book, Semiconductors and Semimetals: The Mechanical Properties of Semiconductors v. 37. In 2003, She was recognized by the Institute for Scientific Information as a Highly Cited Author in Materials Science.

- Chari, C. S. and Faber, K. T. (2022) Oxidation resistance of AlN/BN via mullite-type Al_{18}B_{4}O_{33}. Journal of the European Ceramic Society, 42 (8). pp. 3437–3445. ISSN 0955-2219. doi:10.1016/j.jeurceramsoc.2022.02.037 https://resolver.caltech.edu/CaltechAUTHORS:20220222-706520000
- Chari, C.S., Taylor, Z.W., Bezur, A., Xie, S. and Faber, K.T., 2022. Nanoscale engineering of gold particles in 18th century Böttger lusters and glazes. Proceedings of the National Academy of Sciences, 119(18), p.e2120753119.
- Harder, Bryan J. and Good, Brian and Schmitt, Michael et al. (2022) Deposition of electrically conductive zirconium monoxide via plasma spray-physical vapor deposition. Journal of the American Ceramic Society, 105 (5). pp. 3568–80. ISSN 0002-7820. doi:10.1111/jace.18309 https://resolver.caltech.edu/CaltechAUTHORS:20220121-733841000
- Arai, Noriaki and Faber, Katherine T. (2021) Freeze-cast honeycomb structures via gravity-enhanced convection. Journal of the American Ceramic Society, 104 (9). pp. 4309–4315. ISSN 0002-7820. doi:10.1111/jace.17871 https://resolver.caltech.edu/CaltechAUTHORS:20210504-120148263
- Kuo, Taijung and Rueschhoff, Lisa M. and Dickerson, Matthew B. et al. (2021) Hierarchical porous SiOC via freeze casting and self-assembly of block copolymers. Scripta Materialia, 191 . pp. 204–209. ISSN 1359-6462. doi:10.1016/j.scriptamat.2020.09.042 https://resolver.caltech.edu/CaltechAUTHORS:20201019-100031049
- Faber, K.T., Casadio, F., Masic, A., Robbiola, L. and Walton, M., 2021. Looking Back, Looking Forward: Materials Science in Art, Archaeology, and Art Conservation. Annual Review of Materials Research, 51, pp. 435–460.
- Brodnik, N.R., Brach, S., Long, C.M., Ravichandran, G., Bourdin, B., Faber, K.T. and Bhattacharya, K., 2021. Fracture Diodes: Directional asymmetry of fracture toughness. Physical Review Letters, 126(2), p. 025503.
- Zeng, Xiaomei and Martinolich, Andrew J. and See, Kimberly A. et al. (2020) Dense garnet-type electrolyte with coarse grains for improved air stability and ionic conductivity. Journal of Energy Storage, 27 . Art. No. 101128. ISSN 2352-152X. doi:10.1016/j.est.2019.101128 https://resolver.caltech.edu/CaltechAUTHORS:20191224-093208324
- Brodnik, N.R., Hsueh, C.J., Faber, K.T., Bourdin, B., Ravichandran, G. and Bhattacharya, K., 2020. Guiding and trapping cracks with compliant inclusions for enhancing toughness of brittle composite materials. Journal of Applied Mechanics, 87(3), p. 031018.
- Sturdy, L.F., Wright, M.S., Yee, A., Casadio, F., Faber, K.T. and Shull, K.R., 2020. Effects of zinc oxide filler on the curing and mechanical response of alkyd coatings. Polymer, 191, p. 122222.
- Brodnik, N. R. and Schmidt, J. and Colombo, P. et al. (2020) Analysis of Multi-scale Mechanical Properties of Ceramic Trusses Prepared from Preceramic Polymers. Additive Manufacturing, 31 . Art. No. 100957. ISSN 2214-8604. doi:10.1016/j.addma.2019.100957 https://resolver.caltech.edu/CaltechAUTHORS:20191120-091827034
- Buannic, L., Naviroj, M., Miller, S.M., Zagorski, J., Faber, K.T. and Llordés, A., 2019. Dense freeze-cast Li7La3Zr2O12 solid electrolytes with oriented open porosity and contiguous ceramic scaffold. Journal of the American Ceramic Society, 102(3), pp. 1021–29.
- Tan, W.L., Faber, K.T. and Kochmann, D.M., 2019. In-situ observation of evolving microstructural damage and associated effective electro-mechanical properties of PZT during bipolar electrical fatigue. Acta Materialia, 164, pp. 704–13.
- Stolzenburg, F., Kenesei, P., Almer, J., Lee, K.N., Johnson, M.T. and Faber, K.T., 2016. The influence of calcium–magnesium–aluminosilicate deposits on internal stresses in Yb2Si2O7 multilayer environmental barrier coatings. Acta Materialia, 105, pp. 189–98.
- Naviroj, M., Miller, S.M., Colombo, P. and Faber, K.T., 2015. Directionally aligned macroporous SiOC via freeze casting of preceramic polymers. Journal of the European Ceramic Society, 35(8), pp. 2225–2232.
- Stolzenburg, F., Johnson, M.T., Lee, K.N., Jacobson, N.S. and Faber, K.T., 2015. The interaction of calcium–magnesium–aluminosilicate with ytterbium silicate environmental barrier materials. Surface and Coatings Technology, 284, pp. 44–50.
- Shanti, N.O., Chan, V.W., Stock, S.R., De Carlo, F., Thornton, K. and Faber, K.T., 2014. X-ray micro-computed tomography and tortuosity calculations of percolating pore networks. Acta Materialia, 71, pp. 126–35.
- Chen-Wiegart, Y.C.K., Liu, Z., Faber, K.T., Barnett, S.A. and Wang, J., 2013. 3D analysis of a LiCoO2–Li (Ni1/3Mn1/3Co1/3) O2 Li-ion battery positive electrode using x-ray nano-tomography. Electrochemistry Communications, 28, pp. 127–30.
- Liu, Z., Cronin, J.S., Yu-chen, K., Wilson, J.R., Yakal-Kremski, K.J., Wang, J., Faber, K.T. and Barnett, S.A., 2013. Three-dimensional morphological measurements of LiCoO2 and LiCoO2/Li (Ni1/3Mn1/3Co1/3) O2 lithium-ion battery cathodes. Journal of Power Sources, 227, pp. 267–74.
- Harder, B.J., Ramìrez-Rico, J., Almer, J.D., Lee, K.N. and Faber, K.T., 2011. Chemical and mechanical consequences of environmental barrier coating exposure to calcium–magnesium–aluminosilicate. Journal of the American Ceramic Society, 94, pp.s178-s185.
- Johnson, M.T. and Faber, K.T., 2011. Catalytic graphitization of three-dimensional wood-derived porous scaffolds. Journal of Materials Research, 26(1), pp. 18–25.
- Kaul, V.S., Faber, K.T., Sepulveda, R., de Arellano López, A.R. and Martinez-Fernandez, J., 2006. Precursor selection and its role in the mechanical properties of porous SiC derived from wood. Materials Science and Engineering: A, 428(1–2), pp. 225–32.
- Seitz, M.E., Burghardt, W.R., Faber, K.T. and Shull, K.R., 2007. Self-assembly and stress relaxation in acrylic triblock copolymer gels. Macromolecules, 40(4), pp. 1218–26.
- Pappacena, K.E., Faber, K.T., Wang, H. and Porter, W.D., 2007. Thermal conductivity of porous silicon carbide derived from wood precursors. Journal of the American Ceramic Society, 90(9), pp. 2855–62.
- Su, Y.J., Trice, R.W., Faber, K.T., Wang, H. and Porter, W.D., 2004. Thermal conductivity, phase stability, and oxidation resistance of Y3Al5O12 (YAG)/Y2O3–ZrO2 (YSZ) thermal-barrier coatings. Oxidation of metals, 61(3), pp. 253–71.
- Trice, R.W., Su, Y.J., Mawdsley, J.R., Faber, K.T., Arellano-López, D., Wang, H. and Porter, W.D., 2002. Effect of heat treatment on phase stability, microstructure, and thermal conductivity of plasma-sprayed YSZ. Journal of materials science, 37(11), pp. 2359–65.
