= Ausforming =

Way of increasing the hardness and toughness of an alloy

Ausforming, also known as low and high temperature thermomechanical treatments, is a method used to increase the hardness and toughness of an alloy by simultaneously tempering, rapid cooling, deforming and quenching to change its shape and refine the microstructure. This treatment is an important part in the processing of steel.
