= George W. Brindley =

George William Brindley
- Born: 19 June 1905; Stoke-on-Trent, England, UK
- Died: October 23, 1983 (aged 78); State College, Pennsylvania, USA
- Education: University of Manchester; University of Leeds
- Scientific career
- Institutions: University of Leeds; Pennsylvania State University
- Academic advisors: Lawrence Bragg; Reginald W. James
- Doctoral students: Robert E. Newnham

George William Brindley (19 June 1905 – 23 October 1983) was a British-American crystallographer and mineralogist. He was known for his study of clay minerals including the structure of kaolinites.

== Education and career ==
Brindley studied at University of Manchester in the laboratory of Sir Lawrence Bragg and Reginald W. James, where he obtained an BSc and an MSc in crystallography in 1928. He then moved to University of Leeds, obtaining a PhD in physics in 1933. He subsequently became a Lecturer and a Reader in X-ray physics at Leeds. Until 1945, his research focused on X-ray scattering in metals and its use in studying their lattice vibration and mechanical deformation phenomena.

After the World Wars II, his research interests switched to the study of minerals. In 1953, he became a professor of mineral sciences at Pennsylvania State University. and he became emeritus professor in 1973. He was a founding member of the Materials Research Laboratory (now Materials Research Institute) at Penn State. Brindley is known for the works on crystal structure determination for the classes of minerals kaolinite, dickite, halloysite, serpentine, and chlorite.

After his retirement from Penn State, he became a visiting professor at Tokyo Institute of Technology, University of São Paulo, and University of the West Indies.

== Honors and awards ==
Brindley received the Roebling Medal in 1970 from the Mineralogical Society of America for his work on clay minerals. He received an honorary doctorate from University of Louvain. Since 1984, the Clay Minerals Society has established the annual George W. Brindley Clay Science Lecture in honour of him.

== Personal life ==
Brindley married Catherine F. Fenton on 2 May 1931. They had two children, S. Peter Brindley of Auckland, New Zealand, and Karin Patricia Milstrey of Denver, Colorado. Brindley was a descendent of James Brindley (1716–1772), a famous British engineer during the Industrial Revolution.

== Bibliography ==
- Brindley, George W.; Brown, G. (1980). Crystal structures of clay minerals and their X-ray identification. London: Mineralogical Society. ISBN 0-903056-08-9. OCLC 7098302.
