= W. David Kingery =

Ceramic engineer

William David Kingery
- Born: July 27, 1926; White Plains, New York, United States
- Died: June 28, 2000 (aged 73); Wickford, Rhode Island
- Education: Massachusetts Institute of Technology
- Spouse: Lily Koers Kingery
- Children: William Kingery, Rebecca Jones
- Scientific career
- Fields: Materials science
- Workplaces: Massachusetts Institute of Technology; University of Arizona
- Thesis: (1950)
- Doctoral advisor: Frederick Harwood Norton

William David Kingery (July 27, 1926 – June 28, 2000) was an American material scientist who developed systematic methods for the study of ceramics. For his work, he was awarded the Kyoto Prize in 1999.

== Life ==
Kingery was born on July 27, 1926, in White Plains, New York, one of four children. His father was a doctor in private practice. At the Massachusetts Institute of Technology (MIT), he majored in inorganic chemistry, receiving his BSc in 1948.

A professor at MIT, Frederick Harwood Norton, gave Kingery a stipend to remain at MIT and work on his PhD. Norton had been at MIT since 1939. He was a specialist in refractory materials, materials that retain their strength at high temperatures. He had published the standard textbook on the subject, Refractories. Kingery later described him as a "gifted ceramic sculptor" and also credited him with creating, in the Metallurgy Department at MIT, "the first interdisciplinary ceramic science program anywhere."

Kingery took two years to complete a thesis on the chemical phosphate bonding of refractories and obtained his PhD in 1950. In 1951, he became a member of the faculty at MIT.

When Kingery began working on ceramics, it was a collection of technologies that he later described as "akin to a craft industry". Each type of ceramic – including heavy clays (used for building), refractories, glass, pottery and porcelain – had its own subculture and empirical methods. Kingery built a theoretical foundation for ceramics on solid state physics and crystallography, creating a new field called physical ceramics. He developed quantitative models for the properties of ceramics; and to test them, made advances in the methods of measuring properties such as thermal conductivity. He contributed greatly to methods for processing ceramics, particularly sintering, a method for creating objects out of powders by heating them until they bond. He wrote a series of books on ceramics, culminating in Introduction to Ceramics, a book that became the "founding treatise" for ceramics.

Kingery became a full professor in 1962. In 1987 he left MIT for Johns Hopkins University, and in 1988 joined the University of Arizona as Professor of Anthropology and Materials Science. In the departments of Anthropology and Materials Science and Engineering, he established an interdisciplinary program in Culture, Science and Technology. Among the students he advised was W. Patrick McCray (Ph.D., 1996) who is now a professor of the history of science and technology at the University of California, Santa Barbara.

Kingery and his wife renovated an 18th-century cottage in Rhode Island, which they used as a summer home. An active ocean sailor, he made a single-handed voyage to Bermuda in 1975, and subsequently organized the Marion-Bermuda Yacht Race, an event that has occurred every two years since 1977. He also sailed across the Atlantic for a sabbatical in France and across the Pacific to Tahiti and to the Marquesas Islands, the site of Herman Melville's book Typee. Other interests included horse riding and flying a Piper aircraft.

Kingery died of a heart attack at the age of 73.

== Awards ==
In 1975, Kingery became a member of the National Academy of Engineering. In 1980 he gave the Edward Orton Jr. Memorial Lecture, "Social needs and ceramic technology", to the American Ceramic Society. In 1983 he became a Distinguished Life Member of the society. In 1984 he was elected to the American Academy of Arts and Sciences. From 1989 to 1993, he was chairman of the board of trustees for the Academy of Ceramics. In 1992 the society gave him the Outstanding Ceramic Educator Award; and in 1998 it established the W. David Kingery Prize, with him as the first recipient. In 1999 the Inamori Foundation awarded him the Kyoto Prize for “Fundamental Contribution to Development of the Ceramics Science and Technology Based on the Physicochemical Theory”. The prize came with $400,000. In the citation for the prize, he was called the "father of modern ceramics".

== Works ==
=== Articles ===
Kingery published over 200 articles and his work was cited over 7500 times.

- —; Berg, M. (1955). "Study of the Initial Stages of Sintering Solids by Viscous Flow, Evaporation-Condensation, and Self-Diffusion". Journal of Applied Physics. 26 (10): 1205. Bibcode:1955JAP....26.1205K. doi:10.1063/1.1721874.
- — (1959). "Densification during Sintering in the Presence of a Liquid Phase. I. Theory". Journal of Applied Physics. 30 (3): 301–306. Bibcode:1959JAP....30..301K. doi:10.1063/1.1735155.
- —; Narasimhan, M. D. (1959). "Densification during Sintering in the Presence of a Liquid Phase. II. Experimental". Journal of Applied Physics. 30 (3): 307. Bibcode:1959JAP....30..307K. doi:10.1063/1.1735156.
- —; Pappis, J.; Doty, M. E.; Hill, D. C. (1959). "Oxygen Ion Mobility in Cubic Zr_{0.85}Ca_{0.15}O_{1.85}". Journal of the American Ceramic Society. 42 (8): 393–398. doi:10.1111/j.1151-2916.1959.tb13599.x.
- — (1974). "Plausible Concepts Necessary and Sufficient for Interpretation of Ceramic Grain-Boundary Phenomena: I, Grain-Boundary Characteristics, Structure, and Electrostatic Potential". Journal of the American Ceramic Society. 57 (1): 1–8. doi:10.1111/j.1151-2916.1974.tb11350.x.
- — (1974). "Plausible Concepts Necessary and Sufficient for Interpretation of Ceramic Grain-Boundary Phenomena: II, Solute Segregation, Grain-Boundary Diffusion, and General Discussion". Journal of the American Ceramic Society. 57 (2): 74–83. doi:10.1111/j.1151-2916.1974.tb10818.x.

=== Books ===
- — (1960). Introduction to Ceramics. John Wiley & Sons.
- —; Pamela B. Vandiver (1986). Ceramic masterpieces : art, structure, and technology. New York: Free Press. ISBN 978-0029184806.
