= Thomas Rosenbaum =

American physicist

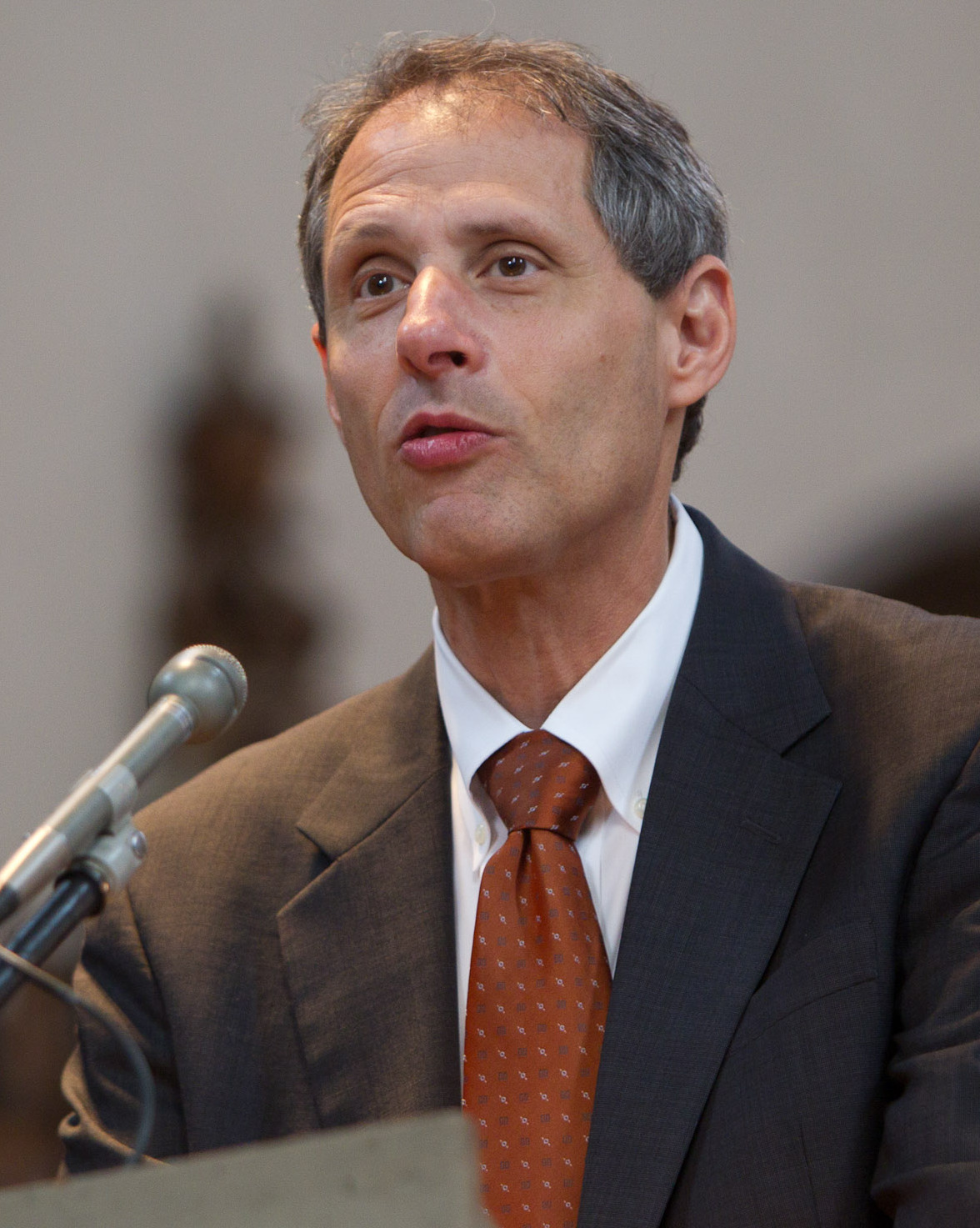
- Rosenbaum in 2010

9th President of the California Institute of Technology
- In office October 24, 2014 – July 1, 2026
- Preceded by: Jean-Lou Chameau
- Succeeded by: Ray Jayawardhana

Personal details
- Born: Thomas Felix Rosenbaum; February 20, 1955 (age 71)
- Spouse: Katherine Faber
- Education: Harvard University (BA); Princeton University (MA, PhD)
- Scientific career
- Fields: Electromagnetism
- Workplaces: Bell Laboratories; Thomas J. Watson Research Center; University of Chicago; California Institute of Technology
- Thesis: Coulomb interactions and localization in a disordered system (1982)
- Doctoral advisor: Gordon Thomas
- Doctoral students: Deborah S. Jin

Thomas Felix Rosenbaum (born February 20, 1955) is an American condensed matter physicist and professor of physics at the California Institute of Technology (Caltech). Prior to his time at Caltech, Rosenbaum served as a faculty member and Provost of the University of Chicago. He has also served as the vice president for research at Argonne National Laboratory.

Rosenbaum served as president of Caltech from 2014 to 2026. His contributions ranged from boosting diversity in STEM through fellowships and research funding opportunities, to establishing a number of initiatives through the largest campaigns in Caltech's history.

== Early life and education ==
Rosenbaum grew up in Queens, New York City, where he spent much of his time playing basketball and frequenting theater and jazz productions. He is of German-Jewish descent, with both sets of his grandparents having left Germany after World War II. During the height of the Cold War, Rosenbaum was inspired by the Apollo program and the Moon landings to pursue physics as a means to solve the world's problems. He attended Forest Hills High School in Queens, and was a finalist in the 1973 Westinghouse Science Talent Search. He received his bachelor's degree in physics with honors from Harvard University in 1977. He then went on to work with Gordon A. Thomas at Princeton University, where he earned his Ph.D. in 1982.

== Career ==
Rosenbaum conducted research at Bell Laboratories, Murray Hill, New Jersey, and at IBM Thomas J. Watson Research Center, Yorktown Heights, New York, before he joined the University of Chicago faculty in 1983. From January 2007, Rosenbaum served as the provost of the University of Chicago. In addition to his responsibilities for academic and research programs across the university, Rosenbaum served and continues to serve on the board of governors for Argonne National Laboratory. He directed the university's Materials Research Laboratory from 1991 to 1994, the university's James Franck Institute, an interdisciplinary research unit, from 1995 to 2001, and served as vice president for research and for Argonne National Laboratory from 2002 to 2006. He is a member of the board of directors of the Bulletin of the Atomic Scientists and the Santa Fe Institute Science Board, a trustee of the National Opinion Research Center (NORC), and a trustee of the University of Chicago Medical Center. Rosenbaum was announced as the eighth president of The California Institute of Technology on October 24, 2013 and took office at Caltech on or about July 1, 2014. Rosenbaum was formally inaugurated into the office on October 24, 2014.

== Research ==
Rosenbaum is an expert on the quantum mechanical nature of materials—the physics of electronic, magnetic, and optical materials at the atomic level—that are best observed at temperatures near absolute zero. Rosenbaum recognized early the significance and ubiquity of quantum phase transitions—from metal–insulator transitions to magnetism to exotic superconductivity—and his work is recognized as putting quantum transitions on as solid a footing as that long available for classical transitions. He has both exploited and advanced methods in experimental low temperature physics, developing new techniques (hydrostatic pressure, stress, magnetometry, calorimetry) for high-resolution studies at milliKelvin temperatures, complementing laboratory dilution refrigerator approaches with synchrotron x-ray measurements in diamond anvil cells at cryogenic temperatures. He established the nature of the metal-insulator transition in doped semiconductors and correlated materials, and demonstrated macroscopic anisotropy of non-s-wave superconductivity in heavy fermion compounds. Rosenbaum's experiments on magnets involve controllable tuning of quantum fluctuations in both ordered and disordered systems. He is interested in the macroscopic manifestations of quantum mechanics and harnessing disorder to craft a material's electrical, magnetic, and optical response.

== Initiatives ==
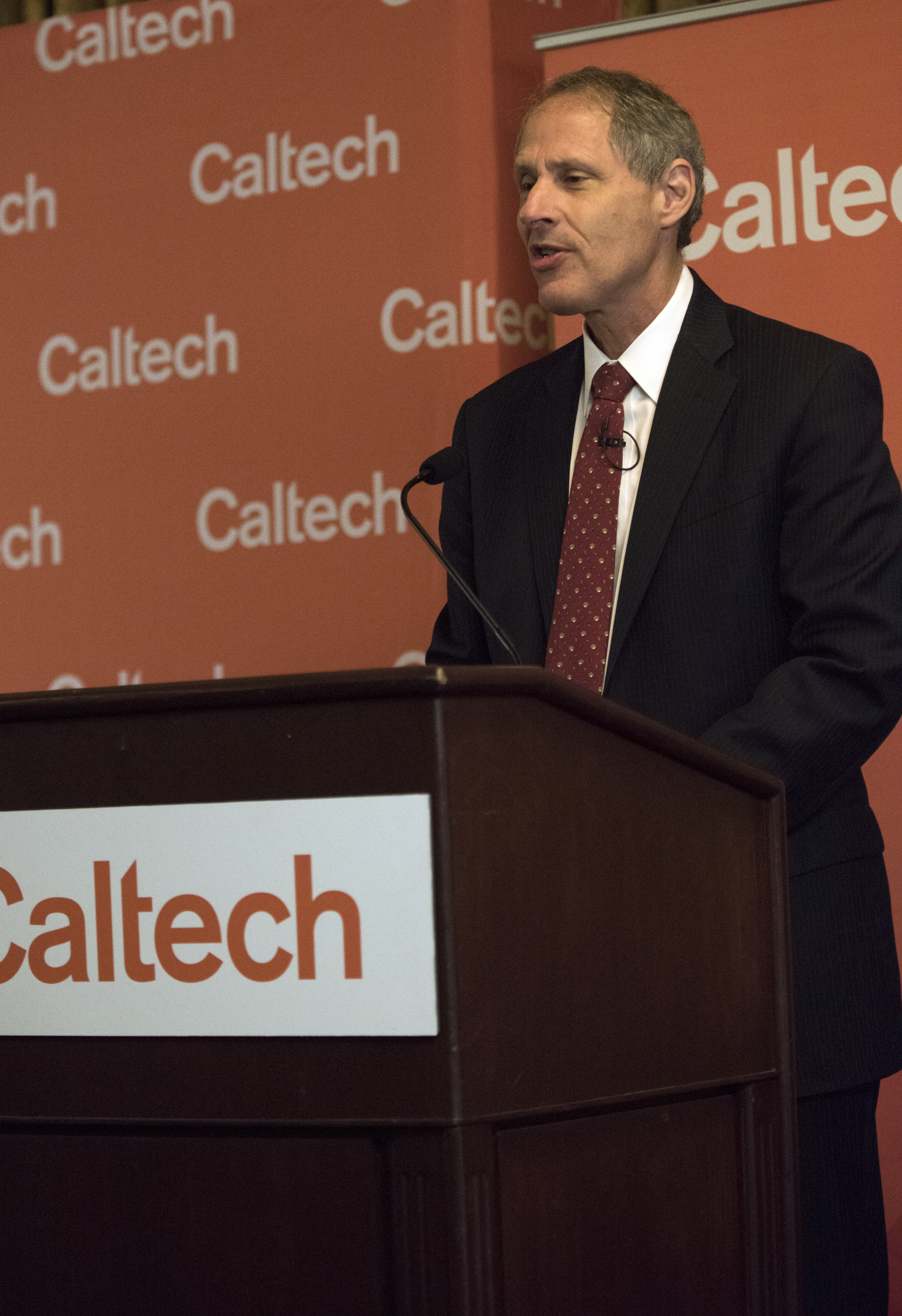
Rosenbaum delivering an address at Caltech in 2017

During Rosenbaum's tenure as president of Caltech, the institute launched several new initiatives and research programs. Under Rosenbaum's leadership, Caltech launched the Resnick Sustainability Institute, the Bioscience Initiative, the Chen Neuroscience Institute, the Rothenberg Innovation Initiative, and the Merkin Translational Institute, among others. More recently, Rosenbaum announced the Hurt Scholars Program and the Initiative for Caltech's Students, programs focused on student support and academic development. He also supported work in seismology at Caltech and advanced research initiatives at the Jet Propulsion Laboratory (JPL).

Alongside his wife, materials scientist Katherine Faber, Rosenbaum has supported graduate fellowships and research funding opportunities. Among their most notable contributions is a fellowship they established at the University of Chicago's Pritzker School of Molecular Engineering in 2014.

Rosenbaum and Faber also established the Guy Rindone Graduate Research Fund which supports graduate students in selecting research topics and broadening their educational experience. Their philanthropic work continued with their significant contribution to the Gordon and Betty Moore Graduate Fellowship Match at Caltech in 2017. Following this, they initiated the Rosenbaum-Faber Family Graduate Fellowship. This fellowship underscores Rosenbaum's dedication to academic freedom, providing graduate students the flexibility to potentially adjust their research paths based on unforeseen results.

== Personal life ==
Rosenbaum is married to materials scientist and expert in ceramic engineering and mechanical behavior, Katherine T. Faber. Together, they have two sons.

== Honors ==
His honors include an Alfred P. Sloan Research Fellowship, an NSF Presidential Young Investigator Award, and the William McMillan Award for "outstanding contributions to condensed matter physics". Rosenbaum is an elected Fellow of the American Physical Society, the American Association for the Advancement of Science, and the American Academy of Arts and Sciences.

== Notes ==
Research and Publications of Thomas F. Rosenbaum: Home | Chicago Quantum Exchange

Academic offices
Preceded by Jean-Lou Chameau	8th President of the California Institute of Technology; 2014 – present	Incumbent
