= Robert E. Newnham =

American academic and writer

Robert E. Newnham, also known as Bob Newnham, (28 March 1929 – 16 April 2009) was an American academic and writer who was a Alcoa Professor Emeritus of Solid State Science at the Pennsylvania State University. He is known for his contributions in the field of ferroelectrics.

== Biography ==
Newnham was born on 28 March 1929 in Amsterdam, New York, United States. He married with Patricia Friss Newnham and they have two children.

Newnham completed his bachelor's of science degree in mathematics in 1950 at Hartwick College and master's of science degree in physics at Colorado State University in 1952. For further study, he went to Penn State University and did a Ph.D. in physics and mineralogy in 1956, where he studied under George W. Brindley. Newnham went to Cambridge University for a second Ph.D. in crystallography in 1960, supervised by Helen Megaw.

Robert E. Newnham Ferroelectrics Award, awarded by the Institute of Electrical and Electronics Engineers, is named after him.

In April 2009, he died at the age of 80.

== Awards and honors ==
- Jeppson Medal
- E.C. Henry Award
- Bleininger Award
- W. David Kingery Award of the American Ceramic Society
- Ultrasonics Achievement Award of the IEEE
- Centennial Award of the Japan Ceramics Society
- Adaptive Structures Prize of the American Society of Mechanical Engineers
- Benjamin Franklin Medal for Electrical Engineering from the Franklin Institute (2004)
- Basic Research Award of the World Academy of Ceramics
