= W. David Kingery Award =

The W. David Kingery Award is an award presented annually by the American Ceramic Society (ACerS) to individuals who have made significant lifelong contributions to the field of ceramic science and engineering. The award is named in honor of W. David Kingery, a prominent figure in ceramics research, and is one of the highest honors bestowed in the ceramics community, celebrating sustained excellence in research, leadership, and education over the course of a career.

== Background ==
The W. David Kingery Award was established in 1998 by ACerS to honor the memory and contributions of W. David Kingery, whose work transformed the field of ceramics. Professor Kingery was the first recipient of the award.

Kingery is often referred to as the "father of modern ceramics" due to his research in ceramic processing, especially in sintering, a process critical to the formation of dense ceramic bodies from powders. His interdisciplinary approach, which combined elements of materials science, chemistry, and physics, revolutionized the manufacturing and application of ceramic materials.

Kingery's research extended beyond basic science to include practical applications, from high-performance materials used in aerospace and electronics to advanced ceramic technologies in energy production and medicine. His influence as an educator was equally impactful, having authored several foundational textbooks in ceramics and materials science, including the influential Introduction to Ceramics. Throughout his career, Kingery was a prominent advocate for the advancement of ceramic engineering and education, mentoring many future leaders in the field.

== Criteria ==
The award is conferred based on a rigorous evaluation of the nominee's career achievements. It recognizes individuals who have demonstrated sustained excellence and made significant, long-term contributions to the field of ceramics, which may include, but are not limited to:

- Breakthroughs in ceramic processing and manufacturing.
- Advances in understanding the mechanical, thermal, or electrical properties of ceramic materials.
- Contributions to the development of novel ceramic materials for structural, electronic, biomedical, or other applications.
- Leadership roles that have advanced the ceramics community, such as through educational programs, mentoring, or service to professional societies.

While the award is open to candidates from both academic and industrial sectors, recipients typically have a body of work that spans decades, influencing not only their own area of expertise but also the broader ceramics community. The award reflects both individual accomplishment and contributions that benefit society as a whole through the advancement of ceramic technology.

== Recipients ==
Many recipients of the W. David Kingery Award have been recognized for their pioneering research and contributions to ceramics, both in academic and industrial settings. These individuals have made advancements in areas such as ceramic processing, high-temperature materials, sintering technologies, and the development of ceramic materials for structural, electronic, and biomedical applications.

Year	Name	Affiliation
2025	Carol Handwerker	Purdue University
2024	Katherine Faber	California Institute of Technology
2023	Vincent G. Harris	Northeastern University
2022	Stuart Hampshire	University of Limerick
2021	Tatsuki Ohji	National Institute of Advanced Industrial Science and Technology
2020	Subhash Risbud	University of California Davis
2019	Michael Cima	Massachusetts Institute of Technology
2018	Shunpei Yamazaki	Semiconductor Energy Laboratory Co. Ltd
2017	Mrityunjay Singh	Ohio Aerospace Institute
2016	Alexandra Navrotsky	Arizona State University
2015	Gary L. Messing	Pennsylvania State University
2014	Greg Rohrer	Carnegie Mellon University
2013	Richard C. Bradt	University of Alabama
2012	William E. Lee	Imperial College London
2011	Zuhair Munir	University of California Davis
2010	Martin P. Harmer	Lehigh University
2009	Frederick F. Lange	University of California Santa Barbara
2008	Arthur H. Heuer	Case Western Reserve University
2007	George Beall	Corning
2006	Hiroaki Yanagida	Nagoya Institute of Technology
2005	S. Donald Stookey	Corning
2004	Delbert E. Day	Missouri University of Science and Technology
2003	Rustum Roy	Pennsylvania State University
2002	Larry L. Hench	University of Florida
2001	Robert E. Newnham	Pennsylvania State University
2000	Richard Brook	St. Cross College, University of Oxford
1999	Joseph E. Burke	University of Chicago
1998	W. David Kingery	University of Arizona
