= Abnormal grain growth =

Phenomenon of certain material grains growing faster than others

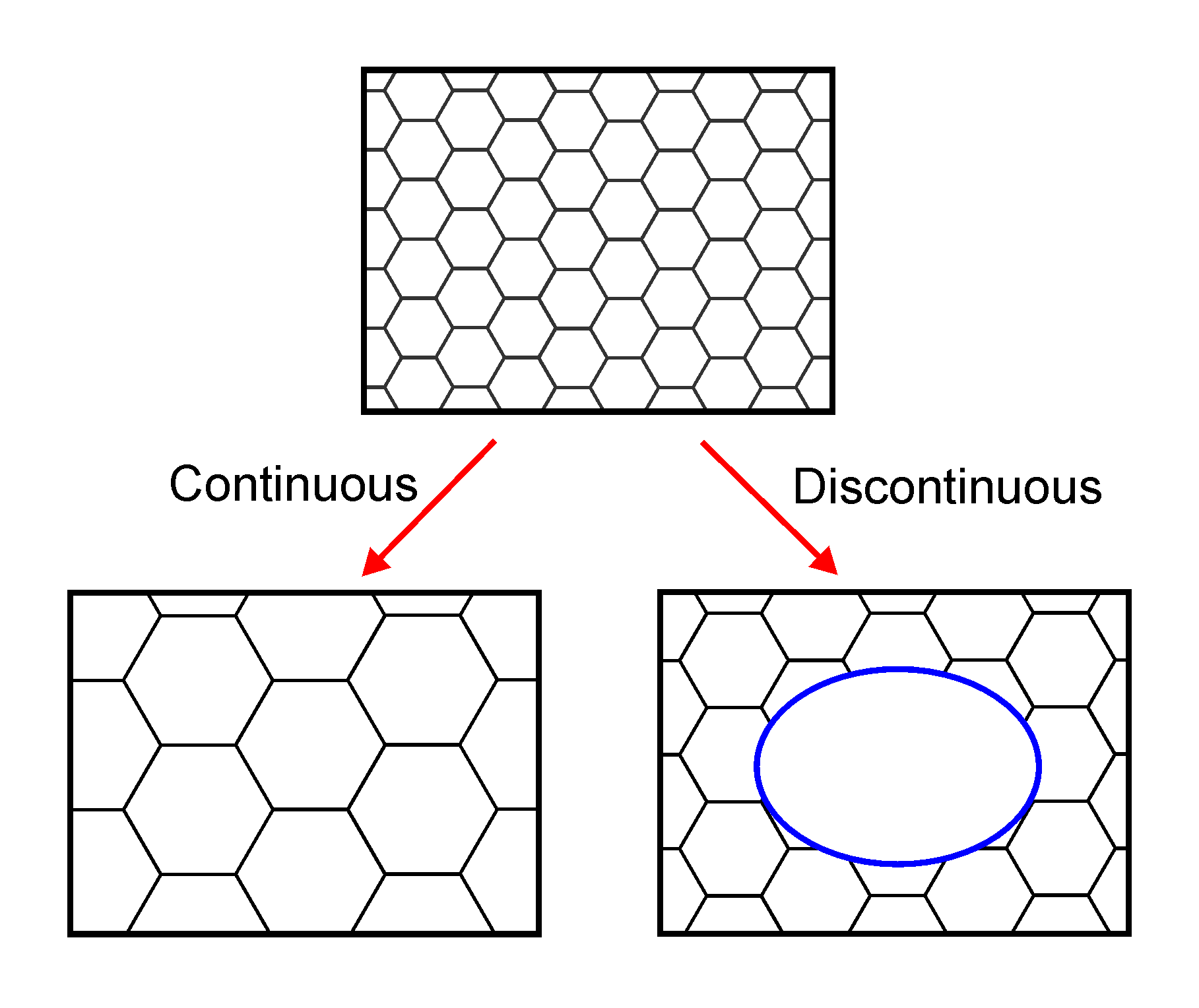
Abnormal or discontinuous grain growth leads to a heterogeneous microstructure where a limited number of grains grow much faster than the rest.

In materials science, abnormal or discontinuous grain growth, also referred to as exaggerated or secondary recrystallisation grain growth, is a grain growth phenomenon in which certain energetically favorable grains (crystallites) grow rapidly in a matrix of finer grains, resulting in a bimodal distribution of grain size.

In ceramic materials, this phenomenon can result in the formation of elongated prismatic, acicular (needle-like) grains in a densified matrix. This microstructure has the potential to improve fracture toughness by impeding the propagation of cracks.

== Mechanisms ==
Abnormal grain growth (AGG) is encountered in metallic or ceramic systems exhibiting one or more of several characteristics:

1. Systems with secondary phase inclusions, precipitates or impurities above a certain threshold concentration.
2. Systems with a highly anisotropic surface energy.
3. Systems far from chemical equilibrium.

Abnormal grain growth occurs due to very high local rates of interface migration and is enhanced by the localized formation of liquid at grain boundaries. In 2023, Liss et al. have shown that the spontaneous activation of a grain boundary opens diffusion pathways, leading to the activation of one grain in an otherwise inactive microstructure and allowing the grain to rotate and coalesce with a neighbor grain. However, due to competition with the surrounding grains, rotation may proceed erratically. Coupled with spontaneous activation, this makes abnormal grain growth a largely erratic process. While the activation of grain boundaries (leading to rotation and growth) can occur at temperatures well below the temperatures required for partial melting of the grain boundaries, the effect is emphasized when melting occurs.

== Significance ==
In the sintering of ceramic materials, abnormal grain growth is often viewed as an undesirable phenomenon because rapidly growing grains may lower the hardness of the bulk material through Hall-Petch-type effects. However, the controlled introduction of dopants to bring about controlled AGG may be used to impart fibre-toughening in ceramic materials. Additionally, AGG is undesirable in piezoelectric ceramics, as it may degrade the piezoelectric effect.

== Example systems ==
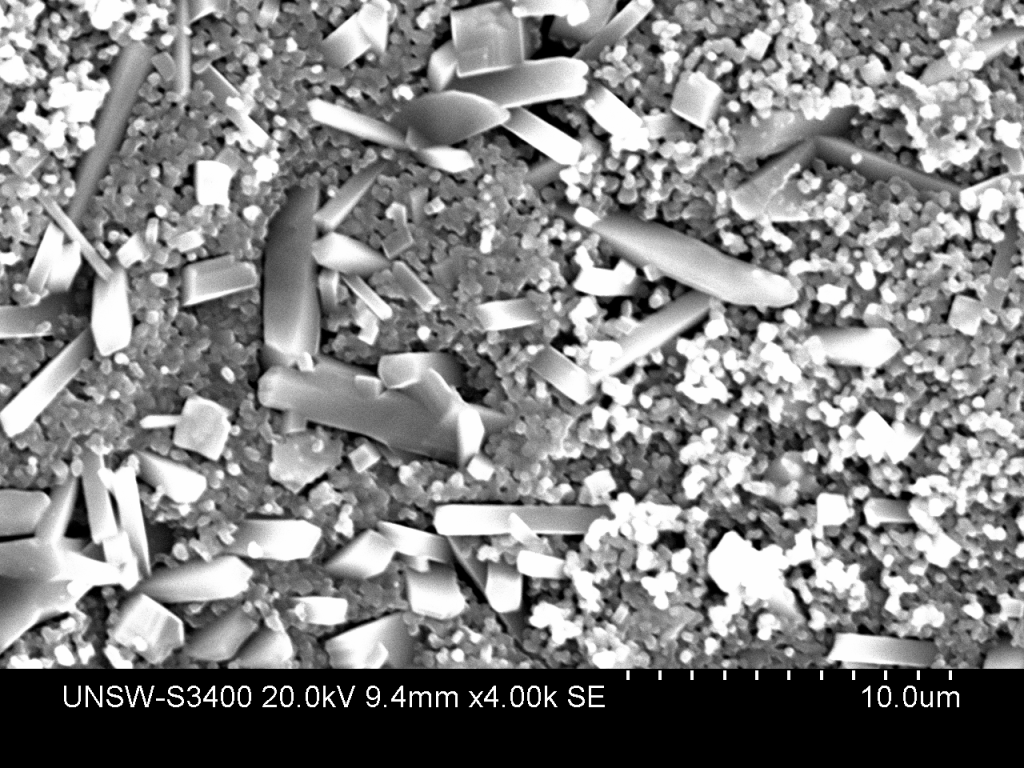
Abnormal grain growth observed in Rutile TiO_{2}, induced by the presence of a zircon secondary phase.

1. Rutile (TiO_{2}) frequently exhibits a prismatic or acicular growth habit. In the presence of alkali dopants or a solid-state ZrSiO_{4} dopant, rutile has been observed to crystallise from an anatase parent-phase in the form of abnormally large grains existing in a matrix of finer, equiaxed anatase or rutile grains.
2. Alumina, Al_{2}O_{3} with silica and/or yttria dopants/impurities has been reported to exhibit undesirable AGG.
3. BaTiO_{3} barium titanate with an excess of TiO_{2} is known to exhibit abnormal grain growth with profound consequences on piezoelectric performance.
4. Tungsten carbide has been reported to exhibit AGG of faceted grains in the presence of a liquid cobalt-containing phase at grain boundaries
5. Silicon nitride (Si_{3}N_{4}) may exhibit AGG depending on the size distribution of β-phase material in an α-Si_{3}N_{4} precursor. This type of grain growth is of importance in the toughening of silicon nitride materials
6. Silicon carbide has been shown to exhibit improved fracture toughness as the result of AGG processes yielding elongated crack-tip/wake-bridging grains, with consequences for applications in ballistic armor. This enhancement of fracture toughness in ceramic materials via crack-bridging resulting from AGG is consistent with reported morphological effects on crack propagation in ceramics
7. Strontium barium niobate, used for electro-optics and dielectric applications, is known to exhibit AGG with significant consequences on the electronic performance of the material
8. Calcium titanate (CaTiO_{3}, perovskite) systems doped with BaO have been observed to exhibit AGG without the formation of liquid as the result of polytype interfaces between solid phases
9. Abnormal grain growth helps manufacture the Goss texture, essential to high-permeability electrical steel.

== See also ==
- Crystallites
- Fractography
- Grain boundary
- Metallurgy
- Micrography
- Micrograph
- Microstructure
- Sintering
