= Lisa Rueschhoff =

American material scientist

Lisa Mae Rueschhoff is an American materials scientist at the Air Force Research Laboratory, where she specializes in the additive manufacturing of fiber-reinforced ceramics for the extreme environments encountered in aerospace applications.

== Education and career ==
Rueschhoff is originally from Omaha, Nebraska. She majored in materials engineering at Iowa State University, graduating in 2013. She completed a Ph.D. in 2017 at Purdue University. Her dissertation was Ceramic Near-Net Shaped Processing Using Highly-Loaded Aqueous Suspensions.

After completing her Ph.D., she joined the Air Force Research Laboratory as a postdoctoral researcher. She later became a permanent staff member and senior materials research engineer.

== Recognition ==
With her Air Force Research Laboratory colleague Matthew Dickerson, Rueschhoff was the recipient of the laboratory's Charles J. Charles J. Cleary Scientific Achievement Award in 2023.

The Purdue University School of Engineering gave Rueschhoff their 38 by 38 award, given annually to 38 alumni, in 2025. She is a 2025 recipient of the Presidential Early Career Award for Scientists and Engineers.

== Personal life ==
Rueschhoff married Rodney Trice, a professor of materials science at Purdue University.
