= Anthony G. Evans =

Welsh professor

- Born: 4 December 1942; Porthcawl, Wales
- Died: 9 September 2009 (aged 66)
- Education: Imperial College London, PhD
- Scientific career
- Fields: Materials Science
- Workplaces: University of California, Berkeley; University of California, Santa Barbara; Harvard University; Princeton University
- Doctoral advisor: Peter L. Pratt
- Notable students: Katherine Faber

Anthony Glyn Evans (December 4, 1942 in Porthcawl, Wales – September 9, 2009) was Alcoa Professor of Materials, professor of Mechanical Engineering, director of the Center for Multifunctional Materials and Structures and co-director for the Center for Collaborative Engineering Research and Education at the University of California, Santa Barbara, United States.

Evans received a Ph.D. in metallurgy at Imperial College London. Evans had previously been, successively, professor in the Department of Materials Science and Mineral Engineering at the University of California, Berkeley; chair of the Materials Department and director of the High Performance Composites Center at the University of California at Santa Barbara; Gordon McKay Professor of Materials Engineering at Harvard University; and Gordon Wu Professor of Mechanical and Aerospace Engineering and director of the Princeton Materials Institute at Princeton University, before returning to Santa Barbara as department chair of the Materials Department.

Evans was vice president of the American Ceramic Society (1984–1988), and for four years served as chair of the Defense Sciences Research Council. He was a Fellow of the Royal Society, the American Academy of Arts and Sciences and the Royal Academy of Engineering, and member of the National Academy of Engineering and the National Academy of Sciences.

== Achievements ==
Achievements include: membership in the National Academy of Sciences, the American Academy of Arts and Sciences and Royal Society of London, and the Royal Academy of London. He was awarded a fellow in the Imperial College of London, Evans' alma mater. Evans' public service included a gold medal at the ASM International, ASME Nadai and Senior US Scientists. Evans authored over a thousand publications, and is one of the most highly cited authors in materials science, as well as engineering and physics. He was known for his innovative contributions and ability to collaborate ideas among colleagues and was recognized with some of the highest accolades in science and engineering. He was Alcoa Professor of Materials, professor of mechanical engineering, director of the center for multifunctional Materials and Structures and co-director for the center for collaborative Engineering research and Education at the University of Santa Barbara.

== Awards and other recognition ==
- 1967 – Matthey Prize (Imperial College)
- 1974 – Ross Coffin Purdy Award (American Ceramic Society)
- 1979 – Richard M. Fulrath Award (American Ceramic Society)
- 1980 – Robert Sosman Award (American Ceramic Society)
- 1983 – Van Horne Distinguished Lecturer (Case Western Reserve University)
- 1984 – Clyde Distinguished Professor (University of Utah)
- 1985–1994 – The Founding Chair of Materials Department UCSB
- 1985 – The American Ceramic Society ( vice president)
- 1986 – Hobart N. Kramer Award (American Ceramic Society)
- 1988 – John Jeppson Medal (American Ceramic Society)
- 1988 – Orton Lecture (American Ceramic Society)
- 1984–1988 – Chair of Defense Science Research Council
- 1989– World Academy of Ceramics( Recognition Academician)
- 1993 – Honorary Fellow (International Congress on Fracture)
- 1994–1998 – Gordon McKay Professor at Harvard University
- 1994 – Griffith Medal and Prize (The Institute of Materials, U.K.)
- 1997 – member, National Academy of Engineering
- 1998 – Peterson Award (Society for Experimental Mechanics)
- 1998 – DARPA Chair ( Defense Advanced Research)
- 1998–2002 – Director of the Princeton Materials Institute at Princeton University
- 1998–2002 – Gordon Wu Professor of Mechanical and Aerospace Engineering
- 1999 – DARPA Chair(Defense Sciences Research)
- 2000 – DARPA Chair (Enhancing DARPA's Defense Sciences)
- 2000 – Distinguished Life Member (American Ceramic Society)
- 2000 – Fellow American Academy of Arts and Sciences
- 2000 – Turnbull Award (Materials Research Society)
- 2001 – McLaren Award
- 2001 – Mellor Memorial Lecturer (The Institute of Materials, U.K.)
- 2001 – Fellow Royal Society (London)
- 2001 – KREIDL AWARD (Rio Grande Regional)
- 2002 – Humboldt Research Award for Senior U.S. Scientists (Alexander von Humboldt Foundation)
- 2003 – Southwest Mechanics Lecture Series Tour
- 2003 – Nadai Medal (American Society of Mechanical Engineers)
- 2004 – Southwest Mechanics Lecture Advocating
- 2005 – member, National Academy of Science
- 2006 – Fellow, Royal Academy of Engineering
- 2005 – Alpha Sigma MU Distinguished Life Member
- 2005 – Alpha Sigma MU Lecturer
- 2005 – ASM Gold Medal
- 2006 – Henry Marion Howe Medal (ASM International)
- 2008 – Fellow, Imperial College London
