= Polymer matrix composite =

Composite material composed of fibers in a polymer matrix

In materials science, a polymer matrix composite (PMC) is a composite material composed of a variety of short or continuous fibers bound together by a matrix of organic polymers. PMCs are designed to transfer loads between fibers of a matrix. Some of the advantages with PMCs include their light weight, high resistance to abrasion and corrosion, and high stiffness and strength along the direction of their reinforcements.

== Matrix materials ==
The function of the matrix in PMCs is to bond the fibers together and transfer loads between them. PMCs matrices are typically either thermosets or thermoplastics. Thermosets are by far the predominant type in use today. Thermosets are subdivided into several resin systems including epoxies, phenolics, polyurethanes, and polyimides. Of these, epoxy systems currently dominate the advanced composite industry.

=== Thermosets ===
Thermoset resins require addition of a curing agent or hardener and impregnation onto a reinforcing material, followed by a curing step to produce a cured or finished part. Once cured, the part cannot be changed or reformed, except for finishing. Some of the more common thermosets include epoxy, polyurethanes, phenolic and amino resins, bismaleimides (BMI, polyimides), polyamides.

Of these, epoxies are the most commonly used in the industry. Epoxy resins have been in use in U.S. industry for over 40 years. Epoxy compounds are also referred to as glycidyl compounds. The epoxy molecule can also be expanded or cross-linked with other molecules to form a wide variety of resin products, each with distinct performance characteristics. These resins range from low-viscosity liquids to high-molecular weight solids. Typically they are high-viscosity liquids.

The second of the essential ingredients of an advanced composite system is the curing agent or hardener. These compounds are very important because they control the reaction rate and determine the performance characteristics of the finished part. Since these compounds act as catalysts for the reaction, they must contain active sites on their molecules. Some of the most commonly used curing agents in the advanced composite industry are the aromatic amines. Two of the most common are methylene-dianiline (MDA) and sulfonyldianiline (DDS). SiC–SiC matrix composites are a high-temperature ceramic matrix processed from preceramic polymers (polymeric SiC precursors) to infiltrate a fibrous preform to create a SiC matrix.

Several other types of curing agents are also used in the advanced composite industry. These include aliphatic and cycloaliphatic amines, polyaminoamides, amides, and anhydrides. Again, the choice of curing agent depends on the cure and performance characteristics desired for the finished part. Polyurethanes are another group of resins used in advanced composite processes. These compounds are formed by reacting the polyol component with an isocyanate compound, typically toluene diisocyanate (TDI); methylene diisocyanate (MDI) and hexamethylene diisocyanate (HDI) are also widely used. Phenolic and amino resins are another group of PMC resins. The bismaleimides and polyamides are relative newcomers to the advanced composite industry and have not been studied to the extent of the other resins.

=== Thermoplastics ===
Thermoplastics currently represent a relatively small part of the PMC industry. They are typically supplied as nonreactive solids (no chemical reaction occurs during processing) and require only heat and pressure to form the finished part. Unlike the thermosets, the thermoplastics can usually be reheated and reformed into another shape, if desired.

== Dispersed materials ==
=== Fibers ===
Fiber-reinforced PMCs contain about 60 percent reinforcing fiber by volume. The fibers that are commonly found and used within PMCs include fiberglass, graphite and aramid. Fiberglass has a relatively low stiffness at the same time exhibits a competitive tensile strength compared to other fibers. The cost of fiberglass is also dramatically lower than the other fibers which is why fiberglass is one of the most widely used fiber. The reinforcing fibers have their highest mechanical properties along their lengths rather than their widths. Thus, the reinforcing fibers maybe arranged and oriented in different forms and directions to provide different physical properties and advantages based on the application.

Carbon Nanotubes

Unlike fiber-reinforced PMCs, nanomaterials reinforced PMCs are able to achieve significant improvements in mechanical properties at much lower (less than 2% by volume) loadings. Carbon nanotubes in particular have been intensely studied due to their exceptional intrinsic mechanical properties and low densities. In particular carbon nanotubes have some of the highest measured tensile stiffnesses and strengths of any material due to the strong covalent sp^{2} bonds between carbon atoms. However, in order to take advantage of the exceptional mechanical properties of the nanotubes, the load transfer between the nanotubes and matrix must be very large.

Like in fiber-reinforced composites, the size dispersion of the carbon nanotubes significantly affects the final properties of the composite. Stress-strain studies of single-walled carbon nanotubes in a polyethylene matrix using molecular dynamics showed that long carbon nanotubes lead to an increase in tensile stiffness and strength due to the large-distance stress transfer and crack propagation prevention. On the other hand short carbon nanotubes do not lead to any enhancement of properties without any interfacial adhesion. However once modified, short carbon nanotubes are able to further improve the stiffness of the composite, however there is still very little crack propagation countering. In general, long and high aspect ratio carbon nanotubes lead to greater enhancement of mechanical properties, but are more difficult to process.

Aside from size, the interface between the carbon nanotubes and the polymer matrix is of exceptional importance. In order to achieve better load transfer, a number of different methods have been used to better bond the carbon nanotubes to the matrix by functionalizing the surface of the carbon nanotube with various polymers. These methods can be divided into non-covalent and covalent strategies. Non-covalent CNT modification involves the adsorption or wrapping of polymers to the carbon nanotube surface, usually via van der Waals or π-stacking interactions. In contrast, covalent functionalization involves direct bonding onto the carbon nanotube. This can be achieved in a number of ways, such as oxidizing the surface of the carbon nanotube and reacting with the oxygenated site, or using a free radical to directly react with the carbon nanotube lattice. Covalent functionalization can be used to directly attach the polymer to the carbon nanotube, or to add an initiator molecule which can then be used for further reactions.

The synthesis of carbon nanotube reinforced PMCs is dependent on the choice of matrix and functionalization of the carbon nanotubes. For thermoset polymers, solution processing is used where the polymer and nanotubes are placed in an organic solvent. The mixture is then sonicated and mixed until the nanotubes are evenly dispersed, then cast. While this method is widely used, the sonication can damage the carbon nanotubes, the polymer must be soluble in the solvent of choice, and the rate of evaporation can often lead to undesirable structures like nanotube bundling or polymer voids. For thermoplastic polymers, melt-processing can be used, where the nanotube is mixed into the melted polymer, then cooled. However, this method cannot tolerate high carbon nanotube loading due to viscosity increases. In-situ polymerization can be used for polymers that are not solvent or heat compatible. In this method, the nanotubes are mixed with the monomer, which is then reacted to form the polymer matrix. This method can lead to especially good load transfer if monomers are also attached to the carbon nanotube surface.

Molecular dynamics simulations have also been used to investigate the mechanical reinforcement of biodegradable polymer matrices by functionalized carbon nanotubes. In poly(lactic acid) (PLA) and poly(glycolic acid) (PGA) nanocomposites, surface functionalization of carbon nanotubes with (3-aminopropyl)triethoxysilane (APTES) has been studied as a means of modifying polymer–nanotube interfacial interactions and stress transfer. Simulations of uniaxial tensile deformation showed that the incorporation of functionalized carbon nanotubes increased the Young's modulus of both polymer matrices, with the magnitude of the reinforcement depending on the polymer, nanotube functionalization, temperature, and interfacial molecular interactions.

Graphene

Like carbon nanotubes, pristine graphene also possesses exceptionally good mechanical properties. Graphene PMCs are typically processed in the same manner as carbon nanotube PMCs, using either solution processing, melt-processing, or in-situ polymerization. While the mechanical properties of graphene PMCs are typically worse than their carbon nanotube equivalents, graphene oxide is much easier to functionalize due to the inherent defects present. Additionally, 3D graphene polymer composites show some promise for the isotropic enhancement of mechanical properties.
