= Oxycarbide glass =

Glass type

Oxycarbide glass, also referred to as silicon oxycarbide, is a type of glass that contains oxygen and carbon in addition to silicon dioxide. It is created by substituting some oxygen atoms with carbon atoms. This glass may contain particles of amorphous carbon, and silicon carbide. SiOC materials of varying stoichiometery are attractive owing to their generally high density, hardness and high service temperatures. Through diverse forming techniques high performance parts in complex shapes can be achieved. Unlike pure SiC, the versatile stoichiometry of SiOC offers further avenues to tune physical properties through appropriate selection of processing parameters.

Amorphous silicon oxycarbide can form as the pyrolysis product of preceramic polymers including polycarbosilane. Such materials are of increasing interest towards the additive manufacturing of ceramic parts using stereolithography type processes. When formed from a polymer precursor, silicon oxycarbide constitutes an important member of the class of materials known as polymer derived ceramics

The microstructure of SiOC can be altered by composition with other phases; In a while micro, meso, and macro-porosities can be introduced by the fabricated composites. The array of porosities is engineered for specific aims, e.g. use as membrane.

== Use as an electrode material ==
=== Pure material ===
Silicon oxycarbide features a high Li‐ion storage capacity ranging from 600 to 700 mAh g^{−1}, low volume expansion upon lithiation of about 7% and high electronic conductivity.

=== As a host matrix ===
To maximize the anodic charge storage capacity of Li-ion batteries, alloying-type anode materials such as Sn and Sb have attracted considerable interest because of their high theoretical capacity of 992 and 660 mAh g^{−1} and a suitable lithiation/delithiation voltage window of 0.01–1.5 V vs. Li^{+}/Li. Recent advances in nanostructuring of the alloying-type anodes provide an effective way of mitigating the challenges of their volume expansion upon lithiation that severely hinder the cycling stability. Besides, one of the prevailing approaches toward stabilization of such electrodes is the embedding of Sn or Sb in the form of nanoparticles in a matrix. The matrix helps to buffer the volume changes, impart better electronic connectivity, and prevent particle aggregation upon lithiation/delithiation. In this context, silicon oxycarbide is an appealing candidate for stabilizing Sn and Sb inclusions.

A facile synthesis of Sn nanoparticles embedded in a SiOC matrix via the pyrolysis of a preceramic polymer as a single‐source precursor has been reported. This polymer contains Sn 2‐ethyl‐hexanoate (Sn(Oct)_{2}) and poly(methylhydrosiloxane) as sources of Sn and Si, respectively. Upon functionalization with apolar divinyl benzene sidechains, the polymer is rendered compatible with Sn(Oct)_{2}. This approach yields a homogeneous dispersion of Sn nanoparticles in a SiOC matrix with sizes on the order of 5–30 nm. Anodes of the SiOC/Sn nanocomposite demonstrate high capacities of 644 and 553 mAh g^{−1} at current densities of 74.4 and 2232 mA g^{−1} (C/5 and 6C rates for graphite), respectively, and show superior rate capability with only 14% capacity decay at high currents.

A similar approach has been reported for the stabilization of Sb nanoparticles; homogeneously embedded Sb nanoparticles in a SiOC matrix with the size of 5–40 nm have been obtained via the pyrolysis of a preceramic polymer. The latter is obtained through the Pt-catalyzed gelation reaction of Sb 2-ethylhexanoate and a poly(methylhydrosiloxane)/divinylbenzene mixture. The complete miscibility of these precursors was achieved by the functionalization of poly(methylhydrosiloxane) with apolar divinyl benzene side-chains. It has been shown that anodes composed of SiOC/Sb exhibit a high rate capability, delivering charge storage capacity in the range of 703–549 mA h g^{−1} at a current density of 74.4–2232 mA g^{−1}.
