= SiC–SiC matrix composite =

SiC–SiC matrix composite is a particular type of ceramic matrix composite (CMC) which have been accumulating interest mainly as high temperature materials for use in applications such as gas turbines, as an alternative to metallic alloys. CMCs are generally a system of materials that are made up of ceramic fibers or particles that lie in a ceramic matrix phase. In this case, a SiC/SiC composite is made by having a SiC (silicon carbide) matrix phase and a fiber phase incorporated together by different processing methods. Outstanding properties of SiC/SiC composites include high thermal, mechanical, and chemical stability while also providing high strength to weight ratio.

== Processing ==
SiC/SiC composites are mainly processed through three different methods. However, these processing methods are often subjected to variations in order to create the desired structure or property:

1. Chemical Vapor Infiltration (CVI) – The CVI method uses a gas phase SiC precursor to first grow SiC whiskers or nanowires in a preform, using conventional techniques developed with CVD. Following the growth of the fibers, the gas is again infiltrated into the preform to densify and create the matrix phase. Generally, the densification rate is slow during CVI, thus this process creates relatively high residual porosity (10–15%).
2. Polymer Impregnation and Pyrolysis (PIP) – The PIP method uses preceramic polymers (polymeric SiC precursors) to infiltrate a fibrous preform to create a SiC matrix. This method yields low stoichiometry as well as crystallinity due to the polymer-to-ceramic conversion process (ceramization). Additionally, shrinkage also occurs during this conversion process, resulting in 10–20% residual porosity. Multiple infiltrations can be performed to compensate for the shrinkage.
3. Melt Infiltration (MI) – The MI method has several variations, including using a dispersion of SiC particulate slurry to infiltrate into the fibrous preform, or using CVI to coat carbon on the SiC fibers, followed with infiltrating liquid Si to react with the carbon to form SiC. With these methods, chemical reactivity, melt viscosity, and wetting between the two components should be considered carefully. Some issues with infiltrating melted Si is that the free Si can lower the composite's resistance to oxidation and creep. However, this technique usually yields lower residual porosity (~5%) compared to the other two techniques due to higher densification rates.

== Properties ==
=== Mechanical ===
Mechanical properties of CMCs, including SiC–SiC composites can vary depending on the properties of their various components, namely, the fiber, matrix, and interphases. For example, the size, composition, crystallinity, or alignment of the fibers will dictate the properties of the composite. The interplay between matrix microcracking and fiber-matrix debonding often dominates the failure mechanism of SiC/SiC composites. This results in SiC/SiC composites having non-brittle behavior despite being fully ceramic. Additionally, creep rates at high temperatures are also extremely low, but still dependent on its various constituents.

=== Thermal ===
SiC–SiC composites have a relatively high thermal conductivity and can operate at very high temperatures due to their inherently high creep and oxidation resistance. Residual porosity and stoichiometry of the material can vary its thermal conductivity, with increasing porosity leading to lower thermal conductivity and presence of Si–O–C phase also leading to lower thermal conductivity. In general, a typical well processed SiC–SiC composite can achieve a thermal conductivity of around 30 W/m-K at 1,000 °C (1,830 °F).

=== Chemical ===
Since SiC–SiC composites are generally sought for in high temperature applications, their oxidation resistance is of high importance. The oxidation mechanism for SiC–SiC composites vary depending on the temperature range, with operation in the higher temperature range (>1000 °C) being more beneficial than at lower temperatures (<1000 °C). In the former case, passive oxidation generates a protective oxide layer wheres in the latter case, oxidation degrades the fiber-matrix interface. Nonetheless, oxidation is an issue and environmental barrier coatings are being investigated to address this issue.

== Applications ==
=== Aerospace ===
Silicon carbide (SiC) ceramic matrix composites (CMCs) are a specific application of engineering ceramic materials used to enhance aerospace applications such as turbine engine components and thermal protection systems. Due to exhibiting high temperature capabilities, low density, and resistance to oxidation and corrosion, SiC/SiC CMCs are largely used in aerospace applications. The use of SiC/SiC CMCs on rotating engine components reduce the complexity of design and engine structure weight, providing improved performance and fuel emissions. The implementation of SiC/SiC ceramic matrix components will improve aircraft and space vehicle performance and fuel efficiency, reducing additional harm to the environment in a cost-effective manner.

Additional applications of SiC/SiC CMCs include combustion and turbine section components of aero-propulsion and land-based gas turbine engines, thermal protection systems, thruster nozzles, reusable rocket nozzles, and turbopump components for space vehicles.

With the development and implementation of future SiC/SiC CMCs, the SiC fiber creep and rupture properties must be examined. Defects such as grain size, impurities, porosity, and surface toughness all contribute to SiC fiber creep and rupture. Due to relatively low toughness, low damage tolerance, and large variability in mechanical properties, CMCs have been limited to less critical components. In the future, the implementation of greater SiC/SiC CMCs into aerospace applications is hindered by lack of understanding of ceramic material characteristics, degradation, mechanisms, and interactions to prevent component life and broaden component design.
