= Silicon oxynitride =

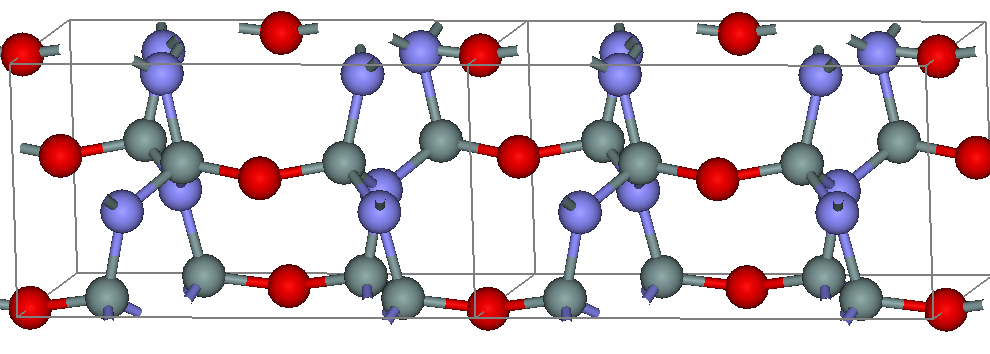

Names
- Other names Silicon nitride oxide, dinitride disilicon oxide

Identifiers
CAS Number	Si_{2}N_{2}O: 12033-76-0
3D model (JSmol)	Interactive image
ChemSpider	8488551
ECHA InfoCard	100.031.617
EC Number	Si_{2}N_{2}O: 234-793-1
PubChem CID	10313086
- InChI: InChI=1S/N2OSi2/c1-4-3-5-2 Key: WGRPUJVSPCGEKW-UHFFFAOYSA-N
- SMILES: N#[Si]O[Si]#N

Properties
Chemical formula	N_{2}OSi_{2}
Molar mass	100.183 g·mol^{−1}
Appearance	Colorless crystals
Density	2.81 g·cm^{−3}

Structure
Crystal structure	Orthorhombic
Space group	Cmc2_{1} No 36, Pearson symbol oS20
Lattice constant	a = 0.48553 nm, b = 0.52194 nm, c = 0.52194 nm, Z = 4
- Except where otherwise noted, data are given for materials in their standard state (at 25 °C [77 °F], 100 kPa). Infobox references

Silicon oxynitride is a ceramic material with the chemical formula SiO_{x}N_{y}. While in amorphous forms its composition can continuously vary between SiO_{2} (silica) and Si_{3}N_{4} (silicon nitride), the only known intermediate crystalline phase is Si_{2}N_{2}O. It is found in nature as the rare mineral sinoite in some meteorites and can be synthesized in the laboratory.

== Properties ==
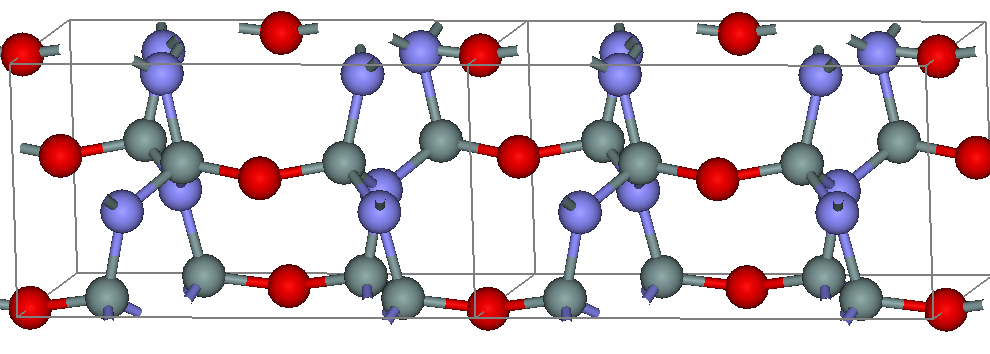
Crystal structure of Si_{2}N_{2}O. Atoms: red – O, blue – N, gray – Si.

The crystalline structure of silicon oxynitride is built by SiN_{3}O tetrahedra connected through oxygen atoms along the c axis and through nitrogen atoms perpendicular to it. The strong covalent bonding of this structure results in high flexural strength and resistance to heating and oxidation up to temperatures of about 1600 °C.

== Synthesis ==
Polycrystalline silicon oxynitride ceramics are primarily produced by nitridation of a mixture of Si and silicon dioxide at a temperature above melting point of silicon (1414 °C), in the range 1420–1500 °C:

3 Si + SiO_{2} + 2 N_{2} → 2 Si_{2}N_{2}O

Silicon oxynitride materials with various stoichiometries may also arise as the products of pyrolysis of preceramic polymers, namely polysilanes and polyethoxysilsesquiazane. SiON materials thus obtained are referred to as polymer derived ceramics or PDCs. By using preceramic polymers, dense or porous Si oxynitride ceramics in complex forms can be obtained using shaping techniques more typically applied for polymers.

== Applications ==
Thin films of silicon oxynitride can be grown on silicon using a variety of plasma deposition techniques and used in microelectronics as a dielectric layer alternative to silicon dioxide and silicon nitride with the advantages of low leakage currents and high thermal stability. These films have an amorphous structure and therefore their chemical composition can widely deviate from Si_{2}N_{2}O. By changing the nitrogen/oxygen ratio in these films, their refractive index can be continuously tuned between the value of ~1.45 for silicon dioxide and ~2.0 for silicon nitride. This property is useful for gradient-index optics components such as graded-index fibers.

Silicon oxynitrides can be doped with metal atoms. The most common example is sialon, a family of quaternary SiAlON compound. Quaternary silicon oxynitrides containing a lanthanide element, such as La, Eu or/and Ce are used as phosphors.
