= Silicon carbide color centers =

Crystal defect

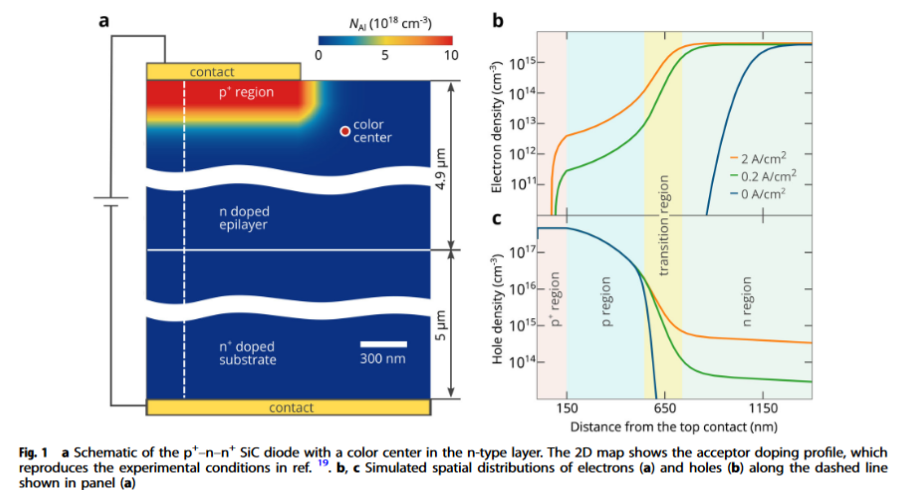
Schematic of the p+–n–n+ SiC diode with a color center in the n-type layer. (2018, I. Khramtsov, A. Vyshnevyy, D. Fedyanin)

Silicon carbide color centers are point defects in the crystal lattice of silicon carbide, which are known as color centers. These color centers have multiple uses, some of which are in photonics, semiconductors, and quantum applications like metrology and quantum communication. Defects in materials have a plethora of applications, but the reason defects, or color centers in silicon carbide are significant is due to many important properties of these color centers. Silicon carbide as a material has second-order nonlinearity, as well as optical transparency and low two-photon absorption. This makes silicon carbide viable to be an alternate platform for many things, including but not limited to nanofabrication, integrated quantum photonics, and quantum systems in large-scale wafers.

== Fabrication ==
There are mainly three methods for fabricating silicon carbide color centers. The three methods are electronic irradiation, ion injection, and femtosecond laser writing.

=== Electronic irradiation ===
This technique works by exposing the material to an electron beam that is highly ionizing. This knocks off electrons in the material itself, which generates color centers (or defects). This process however, requires a large amount of energy, having 9MeV normally being the lower limit of energy in most materials.

=== Ion injection ===
Ion injection is normally used to dope semiconductors, but it can also be used to create color centers. An ion is first accelerated to a certain energy, normally in the MeV range. This ion is then accelerated into the material, which then implants the ion into the material, changing the material composition, which can create a color center.

=== Femtosecond laser writing ===
Utilizing a nonlinear laser writing process, along with the appropriate aberration correction, defects can be generated at any depth in the crystal. This process preserves spin and optical coherence properties. The way it works is from multiphoton ionization from the femtosecond laser process. This method of fabricating defects does not only work for silicon carbide, but can also work for other materials.

Other types of fabrication for defects are neutron irradiation, proton irradiation, and focused Si beams.

Currently, new methods of fabrication are also being experimented with to try and reduce the energy used, or the complication of the process. One of the new methods is a new method of utilizing a laser writing method with a nanosecond laser.

== Types of defects ==
There are multiple types of defects in silicon carbide, some of which are listed below:

- V_{si}^{(-)} (TV1-TV3)
- V_{si}V_{C}^{(0)}
- DV^{(0)}
- Ky5
- CAV (Carbon anti-site-vacancy pair)
- SiC(D_{1})
- N_{C}V_{Si}^{(-)}

Transition metal color centers:

- TI^{(0)}
- Cr^{3+}
- V^{(-)}, V^{(0)}
- Mo^{(0)}
- Er^{3+}

Studies have been done on TV1 as a qubit, which provided a better spin-photon interface than TV2. Recently however, the role of V_{si}^{(-)} as a qubit has been full identified.

== Applications ==
=== Photonics ===
Recently, these color centers in silicon carbide have shown promise in becoming one of the best single-photon emitters for non-classical light sources. Traditionally, attenuated lasers have been the substitute for single-photon sources. This works for quantum cryptography, but they are a partial substitute, and in the end this was not a substitute for single-photon sources as they do not produce single photons. Normally, there are two main methods of generating single photons: spontaneous parametric down-conversion and epitaxial quantum dots.

In spontaneous parametric down-conversion, single photons can be produced up to a rate of 10^{6} photons per second. The drawback to this approach is that there is no way to generate single photons on demand. This makes this type of generation hard to use practically.

Epitaxial quantum dots are shown to generate single photons exceptionally when put under electrical pumping. This however works under very low temperatures, which also makes these applications harder to do practically in experiments.

Color centers in silicon carbide, diamonds, and other related materials would be more practical than the two traditional approaches due to the higher temperature that they can operate at when under optical and electrical pumping.

=== Semiconductors ===
Silicon carbide is currently being used in the semiconductor industry already, due to the fact that it belongs to a family of materials called complementary metal–oxide–semiconductor compatible materials, as well as its reliability in fabrication of high-quality single crystal wafers. Since semiconductors by definition already have point defects, some may be used for purposes like single-photon sources.

=== Quantum properties of silicon carbide color centers ===
When studied at the single defect level, single emitters could be isolated. As a result of this, silicon carbide color centers can be used for applications in quantum cryptography protocols. One example of this was a study on nitrogen-vacancy centers in diamonds in 2014, which are similar to color centers in silicon carbide, that showcased novel results on how in diamonds, the nitrogen-vacancy were color centers, which also are fluorescent impurities that have many applications

Quantum entanglement between the electron spin state and the single photon quantum state occurs when two conditions are met:

1. The quantum state of a single photon can be correlated to the electron spin state of the silicon carbide color centers
2. This correlation is able to be stored in nearby nuclear spins in the color centers

This quantum entanglement allows the creation of quantum networks, which leads to quantum communications, quantum memory, and metrology.

==== Quantum sensing ====
When the color centers are first brought to an excited state, a photon can be emitted from the decay from the excited state to the ground states. This photon can then interact with other sources of static and variable magnetic fields. As a result of this, the spin transition frequency and the coherence time are altered, which then this effect is used in quantum sensing.

== Comparison to diamond color centers ==
Much of the color center research was originally performed using diamond instead of silicon carbide. For comparison, the nitrogen-vacancy in diamond has similar quantum properties to the divacancy in silicon carbide. Diamond's vacancy potentially has better quantum properties than silicon carbide's, but one of the major benefits of silicon carbide and its color centers is increased scalability and greater ease of manufacture when compared to diamond. Additionally, silicon carbide does not suffer from complications in production such as graphitization during irradiation which is possible during diamond color center manufacture.

== See also ==
- Silicon carbide photonics
