= Acheson process =

Chemical synthesis process

Cross-section of an Acheson furnace for producing bulk silicon carbide or graphite

The Acheson process is a method of synthesizing silicon carbide (SiC) and graphite invented by Edward Goodrich Acheson and patented by him in 1896.

== Process ==
The process consists of heating a mixture of silicon dioxide (SiO_{2}), in the form of silica or quartz sand, and carbon, in its elemental form as powdered coke, in an iron bowl.

In the furnace, the silicon dioxide, which sometimes also contains other additives along with ferric oxide and sawdust is melted surrounding a graphite rod, which serves as a core. These rods are inserted in such a way that they are held in contact with each other through the particles of coke, which is commonly called coke bed. An electric current is passed through the graphite rods which heats the mixture to 1700–2500 °C. The result of the carbothermic reaction is a layer of silicon carbide (especially in its alpha and beta phases) forming around the rod and emission of carbon monoxide (CO). There are four chemical reactions in the production of silicon carbide:

1. C + SiO_{2} → SiO + CO
2. SiO_{2} + CO → SiO + CO_{2}
3. C + CO_{2} → 2CO
4. SiO + 2 C → SiC + CO

This overall process is highly endothermic, with a net reaction:

SiO_{2} + 3 C + 625.1 kJ → α-SiC + 2 CO

== Discovery ==
In 1890 Acheson attempted to synthesize diamond but ended up creating blue crystals of silicon carbide that he called carborundum. He found that the silicon vaporized when overheated, leaving graphite. He also discovered that when starting with carbon instead of silicon carbide, graphite was produced only when there was an impurity, such as silica, that would result in first producing a carbide. He patented the process of making graphite in 1896. After discovering this process, Acheson developed an efficient electric furnace based on resistive heating, the design of which is the basis of most silicon carbide manufacturing today.

== Commercial Production ==
Diagram of a resistive Acheson furnace for producing electrode rods formed from powdered coke mixed with silica clay: a – mixture of coke and sand, b – bricks, c – carbon electrodes, d – refractory material, e – rods to graphitize, f – granulated coke

The first commercial plant using the Acheson process was built by Acheson in Niagara Falls, New York, where hydroelectric plants nearby could cheaply produce the necessary power for the energy intensive process. By 1896, The Carborundum Company was producing 1 million pounds of carborundum. Many current silicon carbide plants use the same basic design as the first Acheson plant. In the first plant, sawdust and salt were added to the sand to control purity. The addition of salt was eliminated in the 1960s, due to it corroding steel structures. The addition of sawdust was stopped in some plants to reduce emissions.

Diagram of related Castner lengthwise graphization furnace, legend is same as for the Acheson furnace

To manufacture synthetic graphite items, carbon powder and silica are mixed with a binder, such as tar, and baked after being pressed into shape such as that of electrodes or crucibles. They are then surrounded with granulated carbon acting as a resistive element that heats them. In the more efficient Castner lengthwise graphitization furnace, the items to be graphitized, e.g. rods, are heated directly by placing them lengthwise end-to-end in contact with the carbon electrodes so that current flows through them, and the surrounding granulated carbon acts as a thermal insulator, but otherwise the furnace is similar to the Acheson design.

To finish the items, the process is run for approximately 20 hours at 200 V with a starting current of 300 A (60 kW) for a furnace approximately 9 meters long by 35 cm in width and 45 cm in depth, and the resistance drops as the carbon heats due to a negative temperature coefficient, causing the current to increase. Cool down takes weeks. The purity of graphite achievable using the process is 99.5%.

== Uses ==
Silicon carbide was a useful material in jewelry making due to its abrasive properties, and this was the first commercial application of the Acheson process.

In the 1940s, first the Manhattan Project and then the Soviet atomic bomb project adopted Acheson process for nuclear graphite manufacturing (see details there).

The first light-emitting diodes were produced using silicon carbide from the Acheson process. The potential use of silicon carbide as a semiconductor led to the development of the Lely process, which was based on the Acheson process, but allowed control over the purity of the silicon-carbide crystals.

The graphite became valuable as a lubricant and for producing high-purity electrodes.

== Cancer correlation ==
Occupational exposures associated with the Acheson process are strongly linked to an increased risk of lung cancer.
