= Polysilazane =

Class of polymers with a silicon-nitrogen backbone

In organosilicon chemistry, polysilazanes are polymers in which silicon and nitrogen atoms alternate to form the basic backbone (···−Si−N−Si−N−···). Since each silicon atom is bound to two separate nitrogen atoms and each nitrogen atom to two silicon atoms, both chains and rings of the formula [R_{2}Si−NR]_{n} occur. R can be hydrogen atoms or organic substituents. If all substituents R are hydrogen atoms, the polymer is designated as perhydropolysilazane, polyperhydridosilazane, or inorganic polysilazane ([H_{2}Si−NH]_{n}). If hydrocarbon substituents are bound to the silicon atoms, the polymers are designated as Organopolysilazanes. Molecularly, polysilazanes [R_{2}Si−NH]_{n} are isoelectronic with and close relatives to polysiloxanes [R_{2}Si−O]_{n} (silicones).

== History ==
The synthesis of polyorganosilazanes was first described in 1964 by Krüger and Rochow. By reacting ammonia with chlorosilanes (ammonolysis), trimeric or tetrameric cyclosilazanes were formed initially and further reacted at high temperatures with a catalyst to yield higher molecular weight polymers. Ammonolysis of chlorosilanes still represents the most important synthetic pathway to polysilazanes. The industrial manufacture of chlorosilanes using the Müller-Rochow process, first reported in the 1940s, served as the cornerstone for the development of silazane chemistry. In the 1960s, the first attempts to transform organosilicon polymers into quasi-ceramic materials were described. At this time, suitable (“pre-ceramic”) polymers heated to 1000 °C or higher were shown to split off organic groups and hydrogen and, in the process, the molecular network is rearranged to form amorphous inorganic materials that show both unique chemical and physical properties. Using polymer derived ceramics (PDCs), new application areas can be opened, especially in the area of high performance materials. The most important pre-ceramic polymers are polysilanes [R_{2}Si−SiR_{2}]_{n}, polycarbosilanes [R_{2}Si−CH_{2}]_{n}, polysiloxanes [R_{2}Si−O]_{n} and polysilazanes [R_{2}Si−NR]_{n}.

== Structure ==
Like all polymers, polysilazanes are built from one or several basic monomer units. Linking together of these basic units can result in polymeric chains, rings or three-dimensionally crosslinked macromolecules with a wide range of molecular mass. While the monomer unit describes the chemical composition and the connectivity of the atoms (coordination sphere) it does not illustrate the macro-molecular structure.

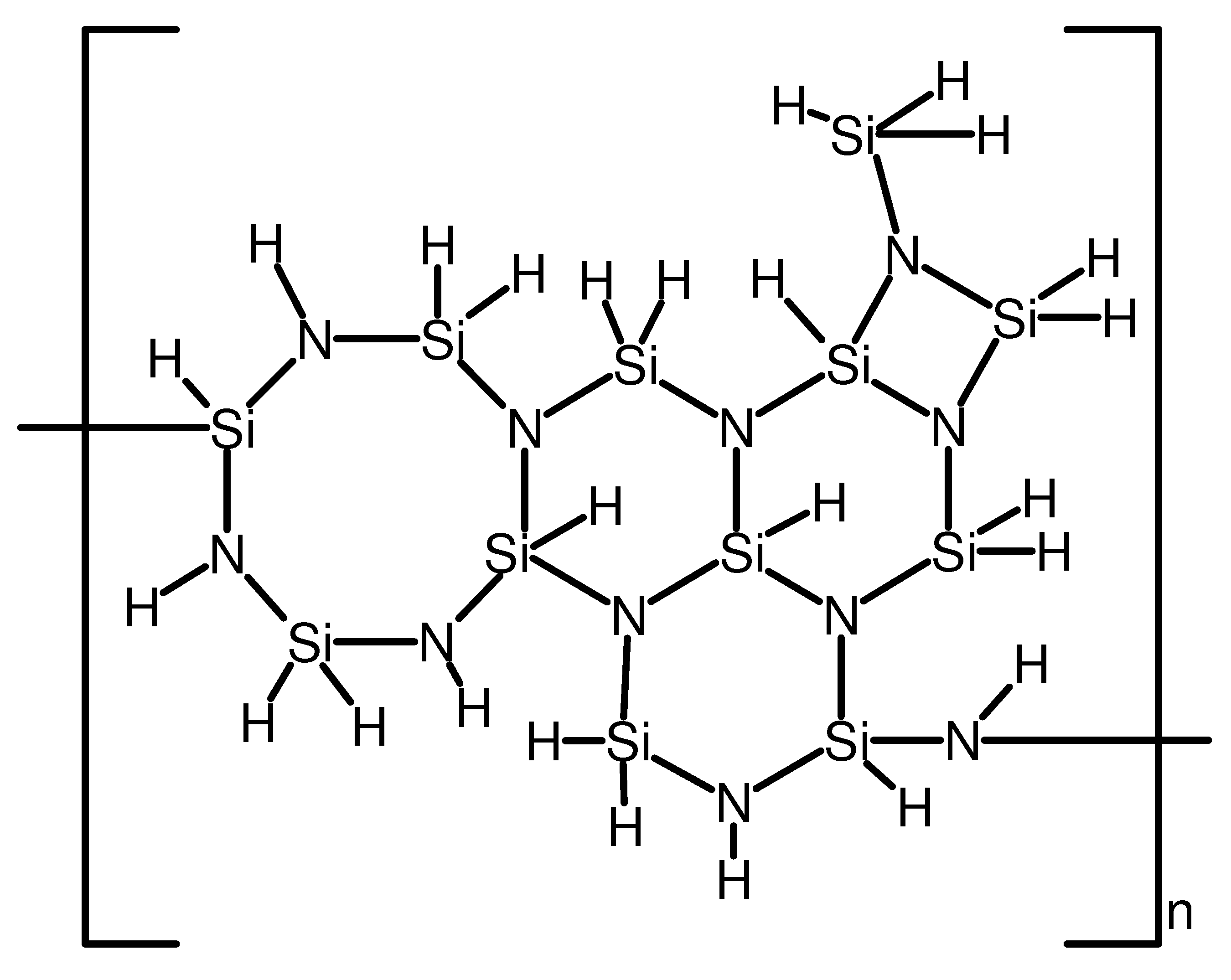
idealized molecular structure of perhydropolysilazane

In polysilazanes, each silicon atom is bound to two nitrogen atoms and each nitrogen atom to at least two silicon atoms (three bonds to silicon atoms are also possible). If all remaining bonds are with hydrogen atoms, perhydropolysilazane [H_{2}Si−NH]_{n} results (proposed structure is shown to the right). In organopolysilazanes, at least one organic substituent is bound to the silicon atom. The amount and type of organic substituents have a predominant influence on the macro-molecular structure of polysilazanes. Silazane copolymers are normally produced from ammonolyses of chlorosilane mixtures. In this chemical reaction, different chlorosilanes react at similar rates so that the monomers are statistically distributed in the copolymer.

== Preparation ==
Ammonia and chlorosilanes, both readily available and low-priced, are used as starting materials in the synthesis of polysilazanes. In the ammonolysis reaction, large quantities of ammonium chloride are produced and must be removed from the reaction mixture.

$$\ce{R2SiCl2 + 3 NH3} \longrightarrow \tfrac{1}{n}\,\ce{[R2Si-NH]}_n + \ce{2 NH4Cl}$$

In the laboratory, the reaction is normally carried out in a dry organic solvent (polysilazanes decompose in the presence of water or moisture) and the ammonium chloride is removed by filtration from the reaction mass. Because the filtration step is both time-consuming and cost-intensive, several production methods were developed in which no solid materials are formed during the final reaction step.

The liquid-ammonia-procedure was developed by Commodore/KiON for polysilazane synthesis. It calls for adding chlorosilane or chlorosilane mixtures simultaneously to an excess of liquid ammonia. The resulting ammonium chloride dissolves in the liquid ammonia and phase separates from the polysilazane. Two immiscible liquids form. This allows for the simple isolation of pure polysilazane from the liquid ammonia/ammonium chloride solution. The patented procedure is used today by Merck KGaA, formerly AZ Electronic Materials in the manufacture of polysilazanes.

Previously, Hoechst AG manufactured VT 50 and ET 70 (now discontinued) as polysilsesquiazane solutions. Synthesis took place in two steps: first a trichlorosilane was reacted with dimethylamine and the resulting monomeric aminosilane was separated from dimethylammoniumchloride. In a subsequent salt-free step, the aminosilane was treated with ammonia to afford a polymer solution.

If hexamethyldisilazane (HMDS) is used as a nitrogen source instead of ammonia, transamination takes place. The chlorine atoms liberated from the chlorosilane are tied to the trimethylsilyl groups of HMDS so that no chlorine-containing solid salts are formed. This procedure was used by Dow Corning to manufacture the hydridopolysilazane HPZ. Numerous additional procedures for the synthesis of Si–N based polymers have been described in the literature (for example a dehydrogenation coupling between Si–H and N–H or ring-opening polymerizations) but none are currently employed commercially.

For the industrial manufacture of perhydropolysilazane [H_{2}Si−NH]_{n}, ammonolysis in a solvent is the standard process. Although this results in a higher price, the material is routinely used as a coating in the electronics industry due to its special properties (insulating effect in thin layers). The product is available in different solvents as 20% solutions.

== Nomenclature ==
Silicon-nitrogen compounds with alternating silicon- ("sila") and nitrogen atoms ("aza") are designated as silazanes. Simple examples of silazanes are disilazane H_{3}Si−NH−SiH_{3} and hexamethyldisilazane (H_{3}C)_{3}Si−NH−Si(CH_{3})_{3}. If only one silicon atom is bound to the nitrogen atom, the materials are known as silylamines or aminosilanes (for example triethylsilylamine (H_{5}C_{2})_{3}Si−NH_{2}). If three silicon atoms are bound to each nitrogen atom, the materials are called silsesquiazanes. Small ring-shaped molecules with a basic network of Si-N are named cyclosilazanes (for example cyclotrisilazane [H_{2}Si−NH]_{3}). In contrast to this, polysilazanes are silazane polymers consisting of both large chains and rings showing a range of molecular masses. A polymer with the general formula (CH_{3})_{3}Si−NH−[(CH_{3})_{2}Si−NH]_{n}−Si(CH_{3})_{3} is designated as poly(dimethylsilazane). According to the IUPAC rules for the designation of linear organic polymers, the compound would actually be named poly[aza(dimethylsilylene)], and according to the preliminary rules for inorganic macromolecules catena-poly[(dimethylsilicon)-m-aza]. The labels normally used to describe the structure of silicones (M, D, T, and Q) are rarely employed for polysilazanes.

== Characteristics ==
Polysilazanes are colorless to pale yellow liquids or solid materials. Conditional of manufacturing, the liquids often contain dissolved ammonia that can be detected by smell. The average molecular weight can range from a few thousand to approximately 100,000 g/mol while the density normally lies around 1 g/cm^{3}. The state of aggregation and the viscosity are both dependent on the molecular mass and the molecular macrostructure. Solid polysilazanes are produced by chemical conversion of the liquid materials (crosslinking of smaller molecules). The solid materials can be fusible or unmeltable and can be soluble or insoluble in organic solvents. As a rule, polysilazane solids behave as thermosetting polymers, but in some cases, thermoplastic processing is possible.

After the synthesis, an aging process frequently takes place in which dissolved ammonia plays an important role. The R_{3}Si−NH_{2} groups resulting from the ammonolysis reaction form silazane units by splitting off ammonia. If ammonia can not escape, the silazane units can be split again into R_{3}Si−NH_{2} groups. Therefore, frequent venting of ammonia can lead to an increase in molecular mass. Also, functional groups that are not bound directly into the polymer backbone can react under suitable conditions (for example Si–H with N–H groups) and increase crosslinking of the rings and chains. An increase in molecular weight can also be observed during storage at higher temperatures or in sunlight.

With contact to water or moisture, polysilazanes decompose more or less quickly. Water molecules attack the silicon atom and the Si–N bond is cleaved. The R_{3}Si−NH−SiR_{3} forms R_{3}Si−NH_{2} and HO−SiR_{3} which can further react (condensation) to form R_{3}Si−O−SiR_{3} (siloxanes). The rate of the reaction with water (or other OH containing materials like alcohols) depends on the molecular structure of the polysilazanes and the substituents. Perhydropolysilazane [H_{2}Si−NH]_{n} will decompose very quickly and exothermically with contact to water while polysilazanes with large substituents react very slowly.

Polysilazanes are not vaporizable because of strong intermolecular forces. Heating polysilazanes results in crosslinking to form higher molecular weight polymers. At temperatures of 100-300 °C, further crosslinking of the molecules takes place with evolution of hydrogen and ammonia. If the polysilazane contains further functional groups such as vinyl units, additional reactions can take place. In general, liquid materials will be converted to solids as the temperature increases. At 400-700 °C, the organic groups decompose with the evolution of small hydrocarbon molecules, ammonia and hydrogen. Between 700 and 1200 °C a three-dimensional amorphous network develops containing Si, C and N ("SiCN ceramics") with a density of ca. 2 g/cm^{3}. A further temperature increase can result in crystallization of the amorphous material and the formation of silicon nitride, silicon carbide and carbon. This so-called pyrolysis of the polysilazanes produces ceramic materials from low-viscosity liquids with very high yield (up to 90%). Due to the organic groups that are often used to give good polymer processability, ceramic yield is normally in the range of 60-80%.

== Applications ==
For a long time polysilazanes have been synthesized and characterized, and their great potential for many applications was acknowledged. However, up to now, very few products have been developed into a marketable commodity. The development effort for these rather expensive chemicals is relatively high because of changing commercial availability among other things. Nevertheless, for some applications, polysilazanes proved to be competitive products.

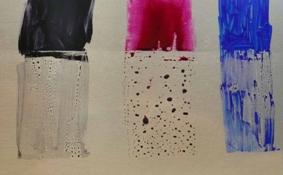
Anti-graffiti effect on coated surface

Taking advantage of their reaction with moisture and polar surfaces, polysilazanes are used as coating materials. Many metals, glass, ceramics or plastics with OH groups on the surface are easily wetted by polysilazanes. Reaction of Si–N with OH leads to the formation of Si–O–metal bonds generating good adhesion of the coating to the substrate. The “free” surface of the coating can react with humidity thereby creating a siloxane-like structure with excellent “easy to clean” properties. TutoProm, an organopolysilazane-based product, is used by Deutsche Bahn on their carriages as an anti-graffiti coating. Beyond that, organopolysilazanes can be applied as high temperature coatings or anti-corrosion varnishes.

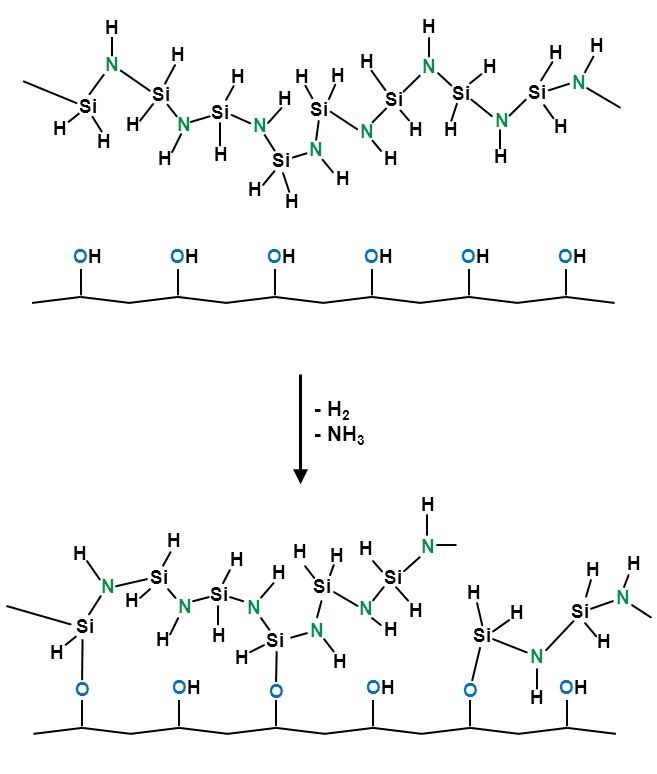
Polysilazane adhesion on polar surface

The inorganic perhydropolysilazane can be used in a similar way. Curing in air yields a carbon-free amorphous coating of SiO_{x}. Compared to organopolysilazane-derived materials, these coatings are less flexible but very smooth and dense. They show excellent barrier properties (against water vapor or oxygen) and a low electrical conductivity. This makes them suitable candidates for different application in electronics or solar industry.

Polysilazanes can be used as or in combination with synthetic resins. First experiments on specially treated components have shown that thermally cured materials can withstand temperatures of 400 - 600 °C. Most plastics are not applicable in this temperature range. The resins will be used for the fabrication of non-combustible fiber-reinforced composites.

Polysilazanes are suitable precursors for ceramic materials. Since most ceramic materials are produced by powder processing and sintering, near net shape forming is very difficult for complex components. With the aid of organic binders added to ceramic powders, injection molding or other casting techniques are possible, but removal of the organics (“debinding”) is expensive and results in fragile “white bodies” which are difficult to handle and shrink significantly during sintering. Pre-ceramic polymers can replace these organic binders. After compounding, casting and curing, the thermoset material can be pyrolyzed in one step to give a ceramic component in high yield. However, this application is still in its infancy in the civilian area.

Physical and chemical properties of pre-ceramic polymers can be varied in a wide range by chemical modifications. This is crucial for the production of ceramic fibers, an important topic both at universities and in industrial research. Silicon carbide fibers made from polycarbosilanes were the first to be used for reinforcement of ceramic matrix composites. The production of silicon nitride fibers from perhydropolysilazane was described by Tonen Corp. at the end of the 1980s. Dow Corning modified the HPZ polymer as a precursor for SiCN fibers, and Hoechst AG did successful experiments with VT50. More recently, G. Singh at Kansas State University demonstrated synthesis of boron-modified polysilazane for synthesis of Si(B)CN functionalized carbon nanotubes, which were stable in air up to 1000 C. The PDC-CNT composites are being explored for applications such as damage resistant coatings for high power laser thermal detectors as well as Li-ion battery anodes.

== See also ==
- conversion of PHPS
