= Sialon =

Class of substances

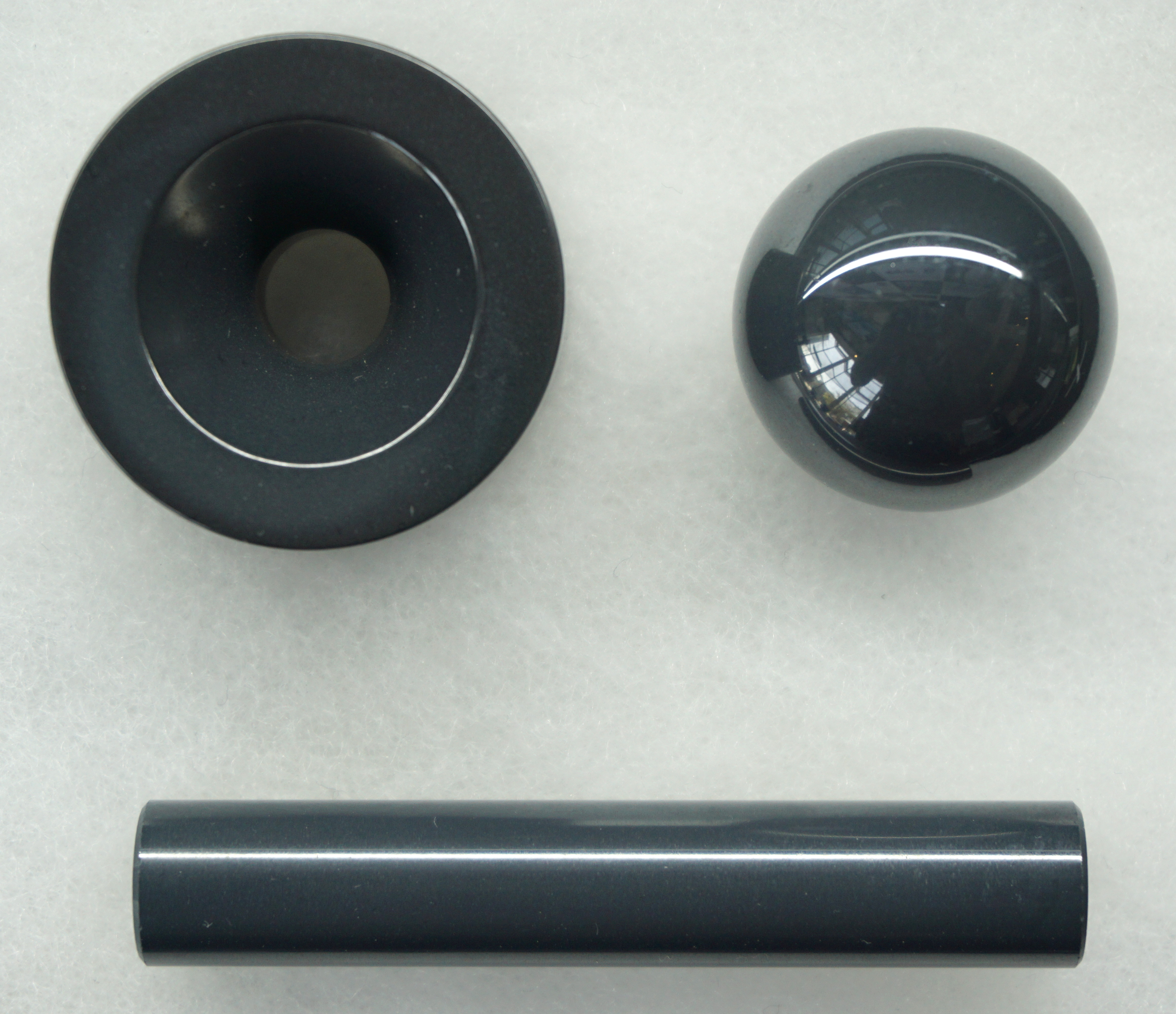
α-SiAlON parts

SiAlON ceramics are a specialist class of high-temperature refractory materials, with high strength at ambient and high temperatures, good thermal shock resistance and exceptional resistance to wetting or corrosion by molten non-ferrous metals, compared to other refractory materials such as, for example, alumina. A typical use is with handling of molten aluminium. They also are exceptionally corrosion resistant and hence are also used in the chemical industry. SiAlONs also have high wear resistance, low thermal expansion and good oxidation resistance up to above ~1000 °C. They were first reported around 1971.

== Forms ==
SiAlON forms
| Form | formula | n | symmetry | space group | No | Pearson symbol | Z |
|---|---|---|---|---|---|---|---|
| α | Si_{12–m–n}Al_{m+n}O_{n}N_{16–n} | | trigonal | P31c | 159 | hP28 | 4 |
| β | Si_{6–n}Al_{n}O_{n}N_{8–n} | 0–4.2 | hexagonal | P6_{3} | 173 | hP14 | 2 |
| O' | Si_{2–n}Al_{n}O_{1+n}N_{2–n} | 0–0.2 | orthorhombic | Cmc2_{1} | 36 | oS20 | 4 |

- m and n are the numbers of Al–N and Al–O bonds substituting for Si–N bonds

SiAlONs are ceramics based on the elements silicon (Si), aluminium (Al), oxygen (O) and nitrogen (N). They are solid solutions of silicon nitride (Si_{3}N_{4}), where Si–N bonds are partly replaced with Al–N and Al–O bonds. The substitution degrees can be estimated from the lattice parameters. The charge discrepancy caused by the substitution can be compensated by adding metal cations such as Li^{+}, Mg^{2+}, Ca^{2+}, Y^{3+} and Ln^{3+}, where Ln stands for lanthanide. SiAlONs exist in three basic forms, which are iso-structural with one of the two common forms of silicon nitride, alpha and beta, and with orthorhombic silicon oxynitride; they are hence named as α, β and O'-SiAlONs.

== Production ==
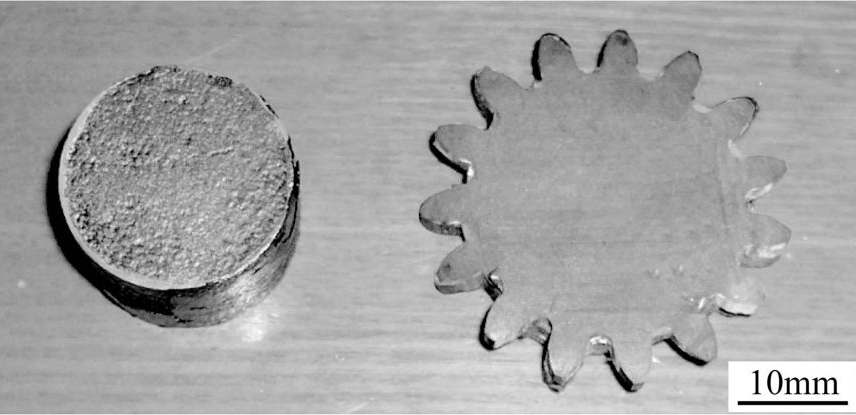
SiAlON gear (right) prepared from a billet (left) by forging at 1200 °C within 2 seconds.

SiAlONs are produced by first combining a mixture of raw materials including silicon nitride, alumina, aluminium nitride, silica and the oxide of a rare-earth element such as yttrium. The powder mix is fabricated into a "green" compact by isostatic powder compaction or slipcasting, for example. Then the shaped form is densified, typically by pressureless sintering or hot isostatic pressing. Abnormal grain growth has been extensively reported for SiAlON ceramics, and results in a bimodal grain size distribution of the sintered material. The sintered part may then need to be machined by diamond grinding (abrasive cutting). Alternatively, they can be forged into various shapes at a temperature of ca. 1200 °C.

== Applications ==
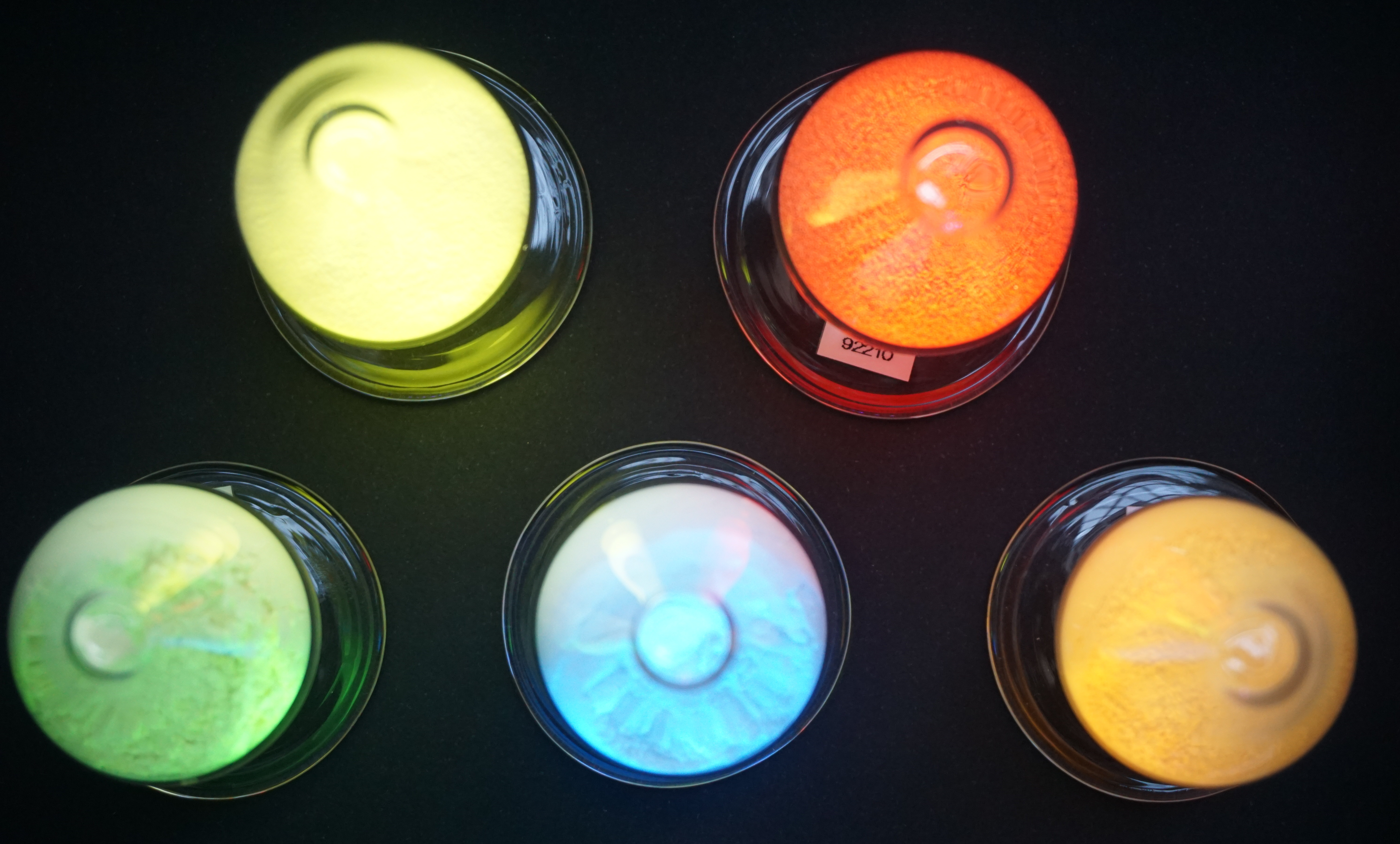
A variety of SiAlON phosphor powders under UV light

SiAlON ceramics have found extensive use in non-ferrous molten metal handling, particularly aluminium and its alloys, including metal feed tubes for aluminum die casting, burner and immersion heater tubes, injector and degassing for nonferrous metals, thermocouple protection tubes, crucibles and ladles.

In metal forming, SiAlON is used as a cutting tool for machining chill cast iron and as brazing and welding fixtures and pins, particularly for resistance welding.

Other applications include in the chemical and process industries and the oil and gas industries, due to sialons excellent chemical stability and corrosion resistance and wear resistance properties.

Some rare-earth activated SiAlONs are photoluminescent and can serve as phosphors. Europium(II)-doped β-SiAlON absorbs in ultraviolet and visible light spectrum and emits intense broadband visible emission. Its luminance and color does not change significantly with temperature, due to the temperature-stable crystal structure. It has a great potential as a green down-conversion phosphor for white LEDs; a yellow variant also exists. For white LEDs, a blue LED is used with a yellow phosphor, or with a green and yellow SiAlON phosphor and a red CaAlSiN_{3}-based (CASN) phosphor.
