= Sinoite =

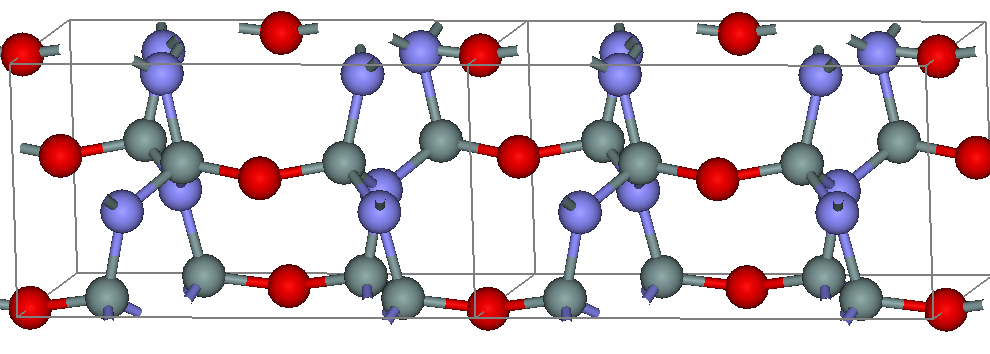
- Crystal structure of sinoite. Atoms: red – O, blue – N, gray – Si.

General
- Category: Silicate mineral
- Formula: Si_{2}N_{2}O
- IMA symbol: Sno
- Strunz classification: 1.DB.10
- Dana classification: 1.3.9.1
- Crystal system: Orthorhombic
- Crystal class: Pyramidal (mm2); H-M symbol: (mm2)
- Space group: Cmc2_{1}
- Unit cell: a = 8.84 Å, b = 5.47 Å c = 4.83 Å, Z = 4

Identification
- Color: From colorless to light gray
- Cleavage: None
- Luster: Vitreous
- Streak: White
- Diaphaneity: Transparent to translucent
- Specific gravity: 2.83
- Optical properties: Biaxial (-)
- Refractive index: n_{α} = 1.740 n_{β} = 1.855 n_{γ} = 1.855
- Birefringence: δ = 0.115

Sinoite is a rare mineral with the chemical formula Si_{2}N_{2}O. It was first found in 1905 in chondrite meteorites and identified as a distinct mineral in 1965. Sinoite crystallizes upon meteorite impact as grains smaller than 0.2 mm surrounded by Fe-Ni alloys and the mineral enstatite. It is named after its SiNO composition and can be prepared in the laboratory as a silicon oxynitride ceramic.

The crystalline structure of silicon oxynitride is built by SiN_{3}O tetrahedra connected through oxygen atoms along the c axis and through nitrogen atoms perpendicular to it. The strong covalent bonding of this structure results in high flexural strength and resistance to heating and oxidation up to temperatures of about 1600 °C.
