= Single-photon source =

Technique in quantum optics

A single-photon source is a light source that emits light as single particles or photons. Single-photon sources are distinct from coherent light sources (lasers) and thermal light sources such as incandescent light bulbs. The Heisenberg uncertainty principle dictates that a state with an exact number of photons of a single frequency cannot be created. However, Fock states (or number states) can be studied for a system where the electric field amplitude is distributed over a narrow bandwidth. In this context, a single-photon source gives rise to an effectively one-photon number state.

Photons from an ideal single-photon source exhibit quantum mechanical characteristics. These characteristics include photon antibunching, so that the time between two successive photons is never less than some minimum value. This behaviour can be experimentally demonstrated by using a beam splitter and single photon detectors, such as avalanche photodiodes, which monitor the output of the beam splitter. A detection from one detector is used to provide a 'counter start' signal, to a fast electronic timer, and the other, is used to provide a 'counter stop' signal. In the case of a stream of single photons to this measurement apparatus there will not be any coincidental detection events. By repeatedly measuring the times between 'start' and 'stop' signals, one can form a histogram of time delays between two consecutive photons. If a true single photon source is observed, the photons are timely separated and a clear notch around zero delay is visible.

== History ==
Although the concept of a single photon was proposed by Planck as early as 1900, a true single-photon source was not created in isolation until 1974. This was achieved by utilising a cascade transition within mercury atoms. Individual atoms emit two photons at different frequencies in the cascade transition and by spectrally filtering the light the observation of one photon can be used to 'herald' the other. The observation of these single photons was characterised by its anticorrelation on the two output ports of a beamsplitter in a similar manner to the famous Hanbury Brown and Twiss experiment of 1956.

Another single-photon source came in 1977 which used the fluorescence from an attenuated beam of sodium atoms. A beam of sodium atoms was attenuated so that no more than one or two atoms contributed to the observed fluorescence radiation at any one time. In this way, only single emitters were producing light and the observed fluorescence showed the characteristic antibunching. The isolation of individual atoms continued with ion traps in the mid-1980s. A single ion could be held in a radio frequency Paul trap for an extended period of time (10 min) thus acting as a single emitter of multiple single photons as in the experiments of Diedrich and Walther. At the same time the nonlinear process of parametric down conversion began to be utilised and from then until the present day it has become the workhorse of experiments requiring single photons.

Advances in microscopy led to the isolation of single molecules in the end of the 1980s. Subsequently, single pentacene molecules were detected in p-terphenyl crystals. The single molecules have begun to be utilised as single-photon sources.

Within the 21st century defect centres in various solid state materials have emerged, most notably diamond, silicon carbide and boron nitride. the most studied defect is the nitrogen vacancy (NV) centers in diamond that was utilised as a source of single photons. These sources along with molecules can use the strong confinement of light (mirrors, microresonators, optical fibres, waveguides, etc.) to enhance the emission of the NV centres. As well as NV centres and molecules, quantum dots (QDs), quantum dots trapped in optical antenna, functionalized carbon nanotubes, and two-dimensional materials can also emit single photons and can be constructed from the same semiconductor materials as the light-confining structures. It is noted that the single photon sources at telecom wavelength of 1,550 nm are very important in fiber-optic communication and they are mostly indium arsenide QDs. However, by creating downconversion quantum interface from visible single photon sources, one still can create single photon at 1,550 nm with preserved antibunching.

Exciting atoms and excitons to highly interacting Rydberg levels prevents more than one excitation over the so-called blockade volume. Hence Rydberg excitation in a small atomic ensembles or crystals could act as a single photon emitters.

== Definition ==
In quantum theory, photons describe quantized electromagnetic radiation. Specifically, a photon is an elementary excitation of a normal mode of the electromagnetic field. Thus a single-photon state is the quantum state of a radiation mode that contains a single excitation. This type of state is completely delocalized.

Single radiation modes are labelled by, among other quantities, the frequency of the electromagnetic radiation that they describe. However, in quantum optics, single-photon states also refer to mathematical superpositions of single-frequency (monochromatic) radiation modes. This definition is general enough to include photon wave-packets, i.e., states of radiation that are localized to some extent in space and time.

Single-photon sources generate single-photon states as described above. In other words, ideal single-photon sources generate radiation with a photon-number distribution that has a mean one and variance zero.

== Characteristics ==
An ideal-single photon source produces single-photon states with 100% probability and optical vacuum or multi-photon states with 0% probability. Desirable properties of real-world single-photon sources include efficiency, robustness, ease of implementation and on-demand nature, i.e., generating single-photons at arbitrarily chosen times. Single-photon sources including single emitters such as single atoms, ions and molecules, and including solid-state emitters such as quantum dots, color centers and carbon nanotubes are on-demand. Currently, there are many active nanomaterials engineered into single quantum emitters where their spontaneous emission could be tuned by changing the local density of optical states in dielectric nanostructures. The dielectric nanostructures are usually designed within the heterostructures to enhance the light–matter interaction, and thus further improve the efficiency of these single photon sources. Another type of source comprises non-deterministic sources, i.e., not on demand, and these include examples such as weak lasers, atomic cascades and parametric down-conversion.

The single-photon nature of a source can be quantized using the second-order correlation function $g^{(2)}(\tau)$. Ideal single-photon sources show $g^{(2)}(0) = 0$ and good single-photon sources have small $g^{(2)}(0)$. The second-order correlation function can be measured using the Hanbury-Brown–Twiss effect.

== Types ==
The generation of a single photon occurs when a source creates only one photon within its fluorescence lifetime after being optically or electrically excited. An ideal single-photon source has yet to be created. Given that the main applications for a high-quality single-photon source are quantum key distribution, quantum repeaters and quantum information science, the photons generated should also have a wavelength that would give low loss and attenuation when travelling through an optical fiber. Nowadays the most common sources of single photons are single molecules, Rydberg atoms, diamond colour centres and quantum dots, with the last being widely studied with efforts from many research groups to realize quantum dots that fluoresce single photons at room temperature with photons in the low loss window of fiber-optic communication. For many purposes single photons need to be anti-bunched, and this can be verified.

=== Faint laser ===
One of the first and easiest sources was created by attenuating a conventional laser beam to reduce its intensity and thereby the mean photon number per pulse. Since the photon statistics follow a Poisson distribution one can achieve sources with a well defined probability ratio for the emission of one versus two or more photons. For example, a mean value of μ = 0.1 leads to a probability of 90% for zero photons, 9% for one photon and 1% for more than one photon.

Although such a source can be used for certain applications, it has a second-order intensity correlation function equal to one (no antibunching). For many applications however, antibunching is required, for instance in quantum cryptography.

=== Solid state single-photon emitters ===
Several different kinds of single-photon emitters have been demonstrated. These include devices based on color centers (point defects in crystals that fluoresce), certain two-dimensional materials, carbon nanotubes, and quantum dots. These types of sources are attractive in part because of the possibility of integrating the source with electronics on a single chip.

== Heralded single photons ==
Pairs of single photons can be generated in highly correlated states from using a single high-energy photon to create two lower-energy ones. One photon from the resulting pair may be detected to 'herald' the other (so its state is pretty well known prior to detection as long as the two photon state is separable, otherwise 'heralding' leaves heralded photon in a mixed state). The two photons need not generally be the same wavelength, but the total energy and resulting polarisation are defined by the generation process. One area of keen interest for such pairs of photons is quantum key distribution.

The heralded single-photon sources are also used to examine the fundamental physics laws in quantum mechanics. There are two commonly used types of heralded single-photon sources: spontaneous parametric down-conversion and spontaneous four-wave mixing. The first source has line-width around THz and the second one has line-width around MHz or narrower. The heralded single photon has been used to demonstrate photonics storage and loading to the optical cavity.

== Bibliography ==
- R. Loudon, The Quantum Theory of Light,:Oxford University Press, 3rd edition (2000).
- Planck, M. (1900). "Über eine Verbesserung der Wienschen Spektralgleichung". Verhandlungen der Deutschen Physikalischen Gesellschaft. 2: 202–204. Translated in ter Haar, D. (1967). "On an Improvement of Wien's Equation for the Spectrum" (PDF). The Old Quantum Theory. Pergamon Press. pp. 79–81. LCCN 66029628.
