= Silazane =

Class of chemical compounds

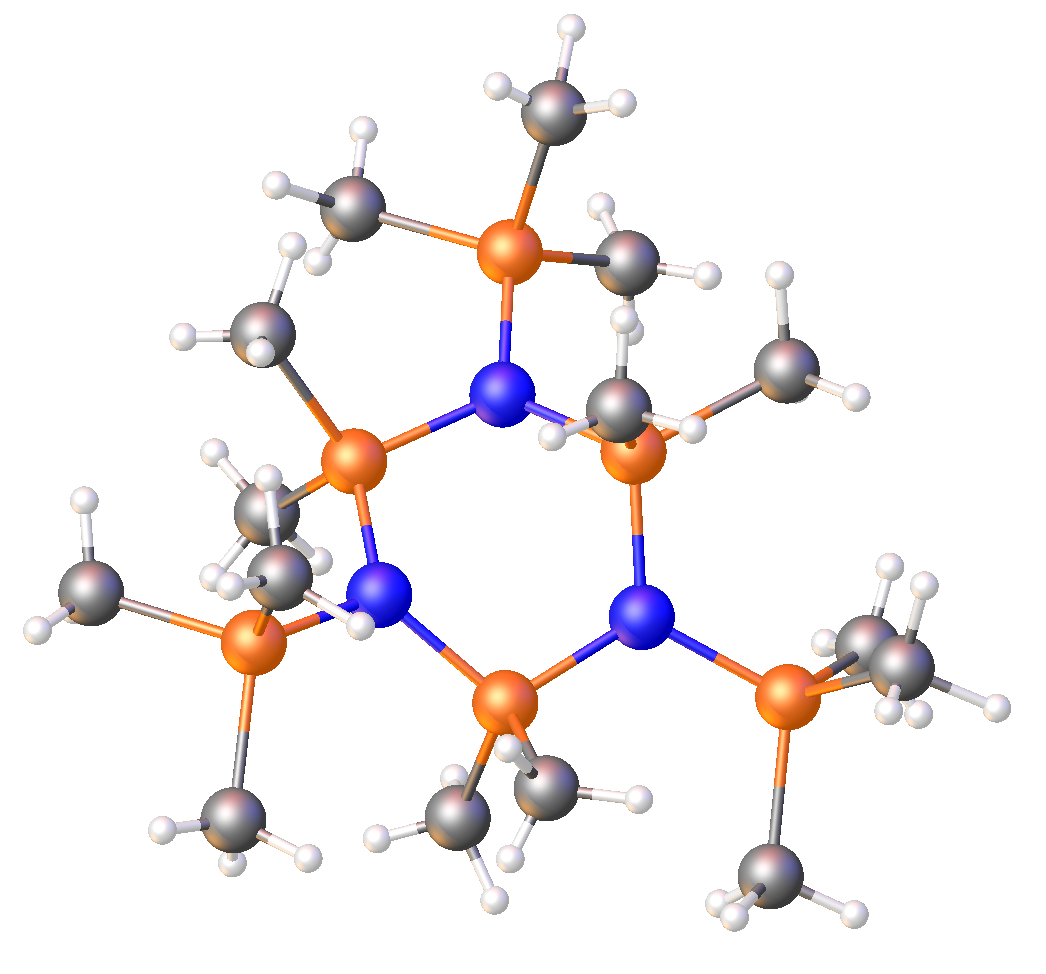
Structure of the silazane (Me_{3}SiN)_{3}(SiMe_{2})_{3}.

A silazane is a family of compounds with Si-N bonds. Usually the Si and N have organic substituents. They are analogous to siloxanes, with -NR- (R = alkyl, aryl) replacing -O-.

== Examples ==
One illustrative family of silazanes are derived from tert-butylamine, including (CH_{3})_{3}SiN(H)tBu and (CH_{3})_{2}Si(N(H)tBu)_{2}.

More structurally complex is [CH_{3}SiN(H)tBu]_{2}(μ-N(H)tBu)_{2} with bridging amides.

There are a wide variety of polysilazanes.

== Reactions ==
The majority of silazanes are moisture sensitive. With water they convert to silanols or siloxanes.

== See also ==
- Phosphazene
- Paraformaldehyde
