= Polymer-derived ceramics =

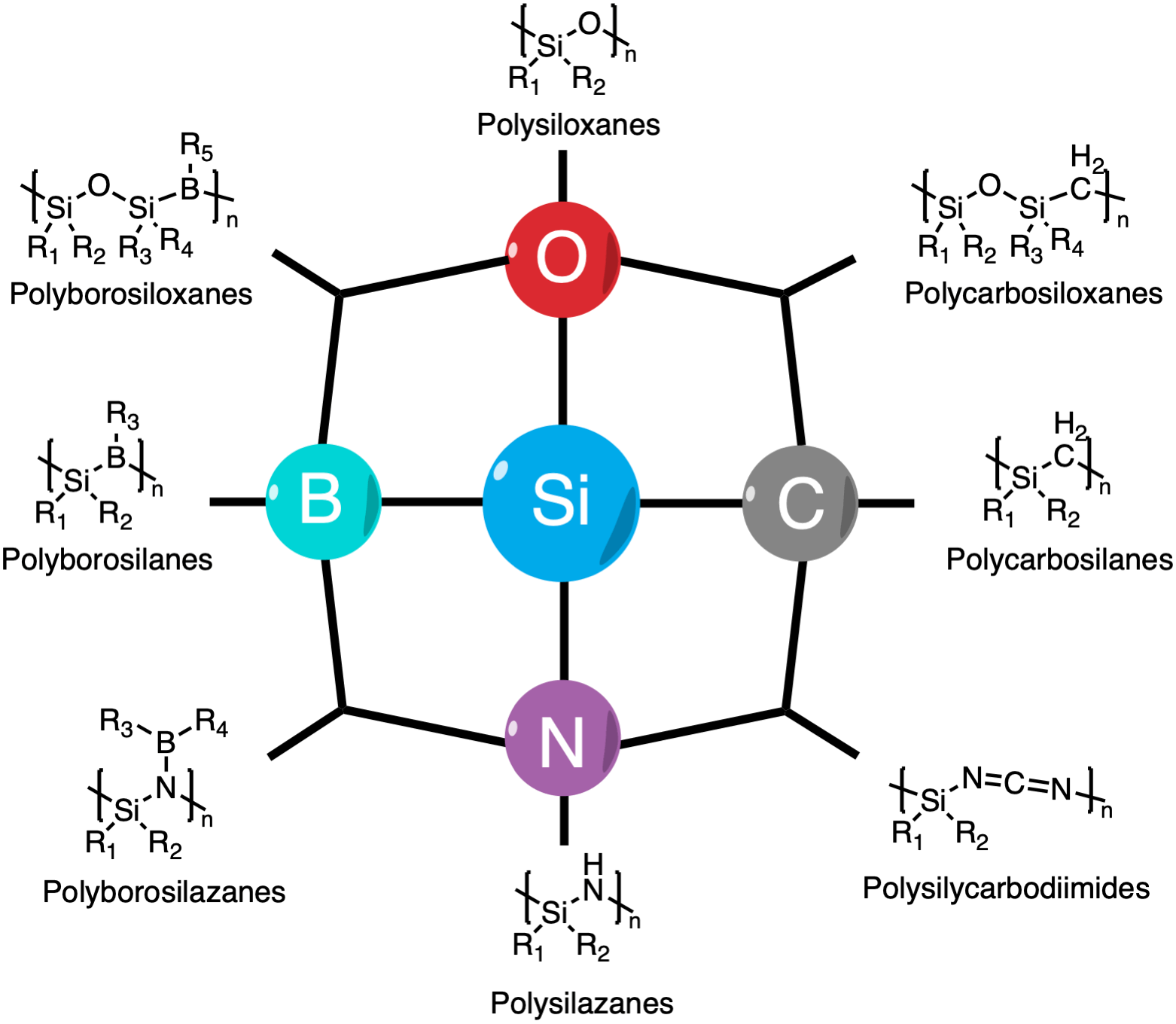
Common examples of preceramic polymer families

Polymer-derived ceramics (PDCs) are ceramic materials formed by the pyrolysis of preceramic polymers, usually under inert atmosphere.

The compositions of PDCs most commonly include silicon carbide (SiC), silicon oxycarbide (SiO_{x}C_{y}), silicon nitride(Si_{3}N_{4}), silicon carbonitride (Si_{3+x}N_{4}C_{x+y}) and silicon oxynitride (SiO_{x}N_{y}). The composition, phase distribution and structure of PDCs depend on the polymer precursor compounds used and the pyrolysis conditions applied.

The key advantage of this type of ceramic material is the versatility afforded by the use of polymeric precursors in terms of processing and shaping. Polymer-derived ceramics can be additively manufactured (3D printed) by means of fused filament fabrication, stereolithography that uses photopolymerization of preceramic polymers. Such processing of PDCs is used in applications requiring thermally and chemically stable materials in complex shapes such as cellular ceramic structures that are challenging to achieve through more conventional ceramic processing routes, such as powder sintering and slip casting. PDCs are also valuable for synthesis of porous and mesoporous materials and thin films.

== Chemistry ==
PDCs are mainly fabricated through the pyrolysis of preceramic polymers.

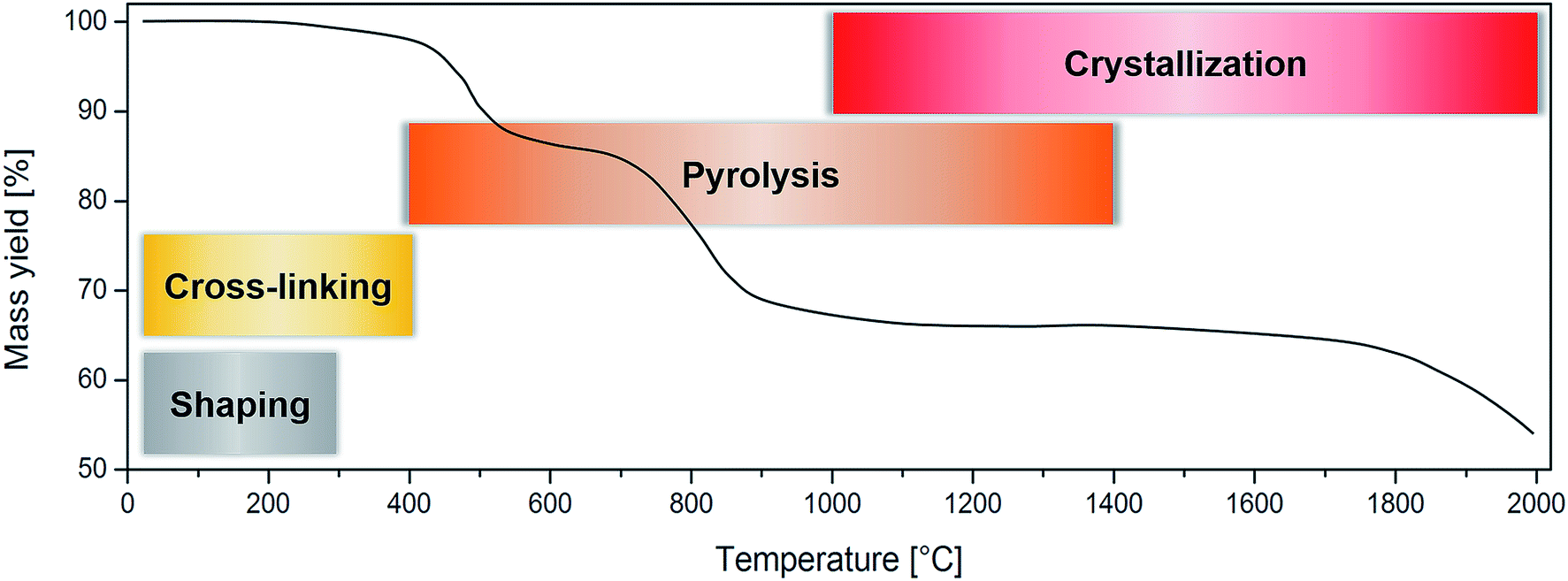
PDC processing

In the families of preceramic polymers, polysiloxanes are the most famous preceramic polymers. The backbones comprise silicon and oxygen atoms. Poly(organo)siloxanes are polysiloxanes with organic groups in the backbones, e.g., polyborosiloxanes, poly(carbosiloxanes). Another category of preceramic polymers is polycarbosilanes and poly(organo)carbosilanes, containing alternating carbon and silicone atoms in the backbones. Similarly, polymers made up of Si-N bonds are classified as polysilazane, poly(organosilazanes) and poly(organosilylcarbodiimides). Different polymer compositions influence processing temperatures, microstructure transitions, ceramic yields and stabilities.

The conversion of preceramic polymers to PDCs can be divided into four phases: shaping, cross-linking, pyrolysis, and crystallization. Typically, PDC processing is completed at 1100 °C–1300 °C. To form a crystalline PDC, some materials require higher temperature to crystalize, usually over 1700 °C.

== Properties ==
PDCs are characteristic with many properties, including:

- Mechanical properties: high hardness, modulus and strength.
- Stability in extreme environments: good thermostability, high oxidation and corrosion resistance.
- Adhesion properties: high adhesive attraction and low surface tension.
- Durability: wear resistance, anti-fouling and anti-biofilm formation properties.
- Low toxicity and biocompatibility.

The combination of PDCs and other materials with different properties can develop combining properties for PDC-based composite materials. PDC-based composite materials can extend functions and usages of PDCs to a wide range of areas, for example, in biological, medical, electrical, magnetic, engineering and optical applications.

== Uses ==
=== Coatings ===
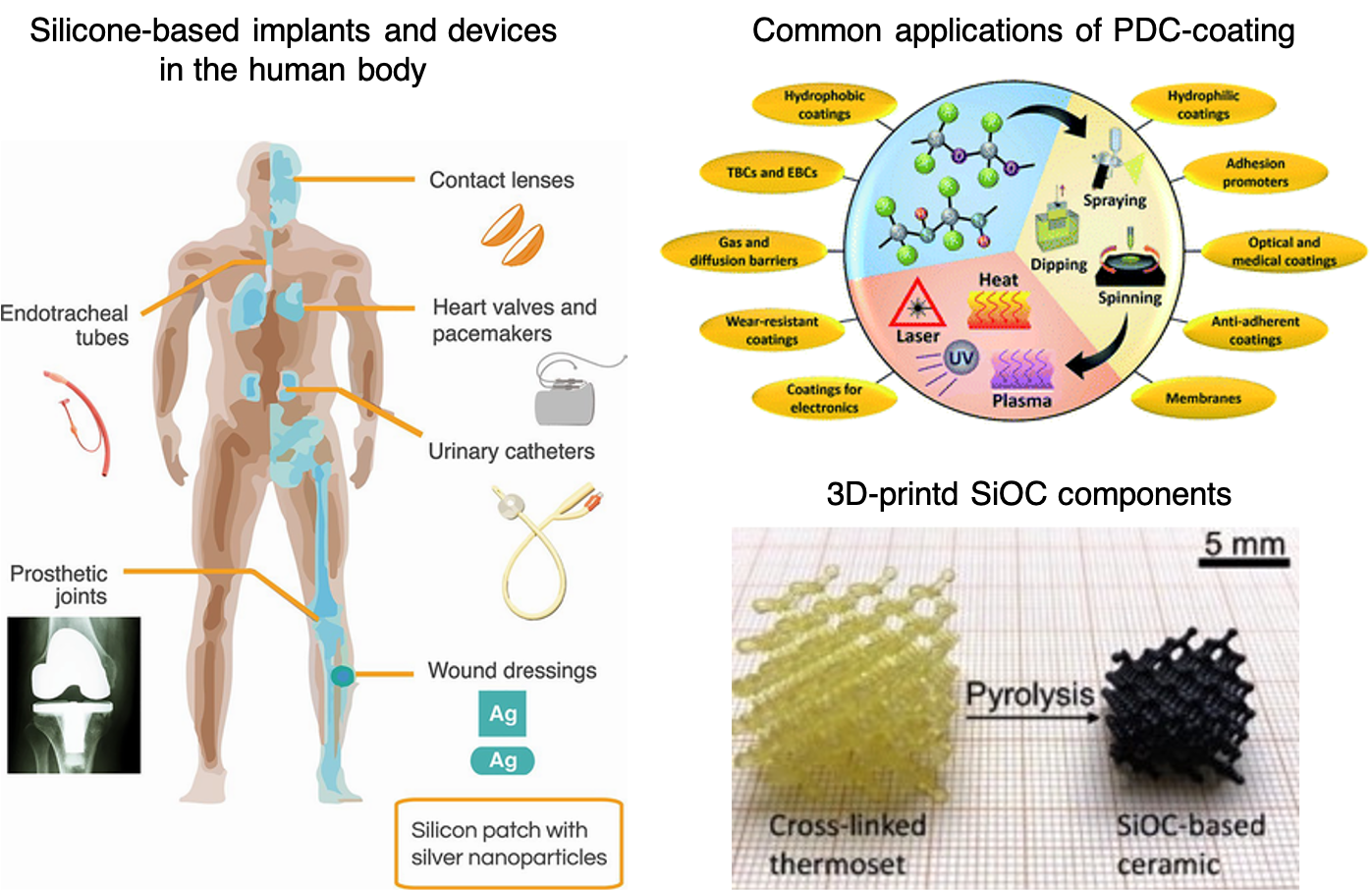
Representative uses of polymer-derived ceramics and PDC-based materials

Compared with other coating methods, the thermal treatment (e.g. thermal spraying) of PDC processing is simple and low-cost. PDC coatings are good components in electronic devices and gas separation membranes. Due to the intrinsic stability of PDC materials, PDC coatings are also commonly used in environmental barrier coatings (EBCs).

=== 3D printing ===
Fused filament fabrication 3D printing-based polymers to use for PDC processing on a wide range of applications such as heat exchangers, heat sinks, scaffolding for bone tissue growth, chemical/ gas filters and custom open hardware. Specific 3D printing techniques such as direct ink writing (DIW), stereolithography (SLA) and digital light processing (DLP) can control the structure of preceramic polymers from nanoscale to macroscale. 3D printing of PDCs can facilitate the fabrication and integration of advanced ceramic materials.

=== Biomedical engineering ===
Biocompatible PDCs and PDC-based composites can be applied in various biological systems. They are usually used to produce interface or surface with multi-functionality and complex shapes for biomedical applications, such as tissue regeneration, implant design, drug delivery, and wound dressing.

=== Electronics ===
Hybrid PDC materials are feasible and tunable for substrate manufacturing in lithium ion batteries, sensors, actuators, high temperature electrical devices, etc. Common processing strategies of PDC composites for electronic applications include chemical modification, blending with metal or metal oxides, and incorporating with functional fillers.
