= Graphitization =

Process of transforming certain materials into graphite

Graphitization is a process of transforming a carbonaceous material, such as coal or the carbon in certain forms of iron alloys, into graphite.

== Process ==
The graphitization process involves a restructuring of the molecular structure of the carbon material. In the initial state, these materials can have an amorphous structure or a crystalline structure different from graphite. Graphitization generally occurs at high temperatures (up to 3,000 °C (5,430 °F)), and can be accelerated by catalysts such as iron or nickel.

When carbonaceous material is exposed to high temperatures for an extended period of time, the carbon atoms begin to rearrange and form layered crystal planes. In the structure of graphite, carbon atoms are arranged in flat hexagonal sheets that are stacked on top of each other. These crystal planes give graphite its characteristic flake structure, giving it specific properties such as good electrical and thermal conductivity, low friction, and excellent lubrication.

== Interest ==
Graphitization can be observed in various contexts. For example, it occurs naturally during the formation of certain types of coal or graphite in the Earth's crust. It can also be artificially induced during the manufacture of specific carbon materials, such as graphite electrodes used in fuel cells, nuclear reactors, or metallurgical applications.

Graphitization is of particular interest in the field of metallurgy. Some iron alloys, such as cast iron, can undergo graphitization heat treatment to improve their mechanical properties and machinability. During this process, the carbon dissolved in the iron alloy matrix separates and restructures as graphite, which gives the cast iron its specific characteristics, such as improved ductility and wear resistance.

== See also ==
- Graphitic corrosion, slow conversion of cast iron into a weaker matrix of graphite and oxides
