= Preceramic polymer =

The term preceramic polymer refers to one of various polymeric compounds, which through pyrolysis under appropriate conditions (generally in the absence of oxygen) are converted to ceramic compounds, having high thermal and chemical stability. Ceramics resulting from the pyrolysis of preceramic polymers are known as polymer derived ceramics, or PDCs. Polymer derived ceramics are most often silicon based and include silicon carbide, silicon oxycarbide, silicon nitride and silicon oxynitride. Such PDCs are most commonly amorphous, lacking long-range crystalline order.

The field of preceramic polymers and polymer derived ceramics in general emerged from the requirements in aerospace industries for heat shield materials such as fiber reinforced ceramic / ceramic composite materials. The use of preceramic polymers allows for diverse processing techniques relative to conventional ceramic processing. For example, the spinning of fibres, casting of thin films and the molding of complex shapes. Commonly used preceramic polymers include polycarbosilanes and polysiloxanes, which transform through pyrolysis to SiC and SiOC type ceramics respectively.

A low-cost method of creating complex 3D shapes of ceramics components is to use additive manufacturing (AM) in a use a two-step process of first printing the artifact in polymer and then converting it to ceramic using pyrolysis to form polymer derived ceramics (PDCs). This process works with fused filament fabrication (FFF)-based 3-D printing to make fully dense cellular structures, which can be used for scaffolds for bone regeneration that need to be mechanically stable and have a 3D architecture with interconnected pores. Various other 3D printing techniques (e.g., stereolithography, digital light processing, and two-photon polymerization) that are compatible with this strategy have so far been widely investigated. For example, through photopolymerization methods, preceramic polymers can be used in stereolithography approaches, enabling the additive manufacturing of complex shaped ceramic objects. In such methods, by means of irradiation-driven cross-linking, liquid preceramic polymers transform into rigid thermoset polymers that preserve their shape through the following polymer-to-ceramic transformation that takes place in pyrolysis. In this transformation, polymers transform into glassy ceramic products.
