= Powder metallurgy =

Process of sintering metal powders

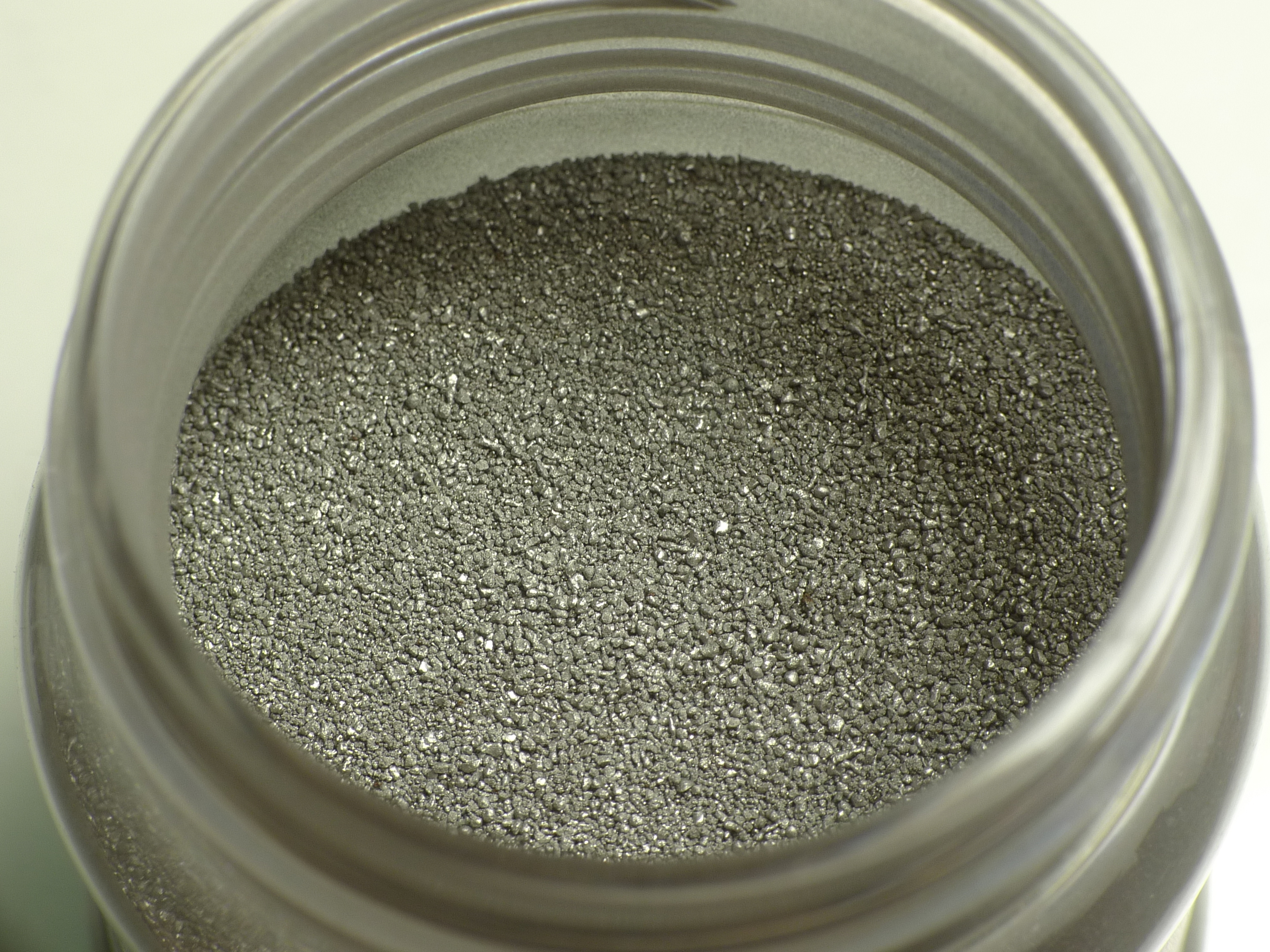
Iron powder is commonly used for sintering

Powder metallurgy (PM) is a wide range of ways in which materials or components are made from metal powders. PM processes are sometimes used to reduce or eliminate the need for subtractive processes in manufacturing, lowering material losses and reducing the cost of the final product. This occurs especially often with small metal parts, like gears for small machines. Some porous products, allowing liquid or gas to permeate them, are produced in this way. They are also used when melting a material is impractical, due to it having a high melting point, or an alloy of two mutually insoluble materials, such as a mixture of copper and graphite.

In this way, powder metallurgy can be used to make unique materials impossible to get from melting or forming in other ways. A very important product of this type is tungsten carbide. Tungsten carbide is used to cut and form other metals and is made from tungsten carbide particles bonded with cobalt. Tungsten carbide is the largest and most important use of tungsten, consuming about 50% of the world supply. Other products include sintered filters, porous oil-impregnated bearings, electrical contacts and diamond tools.

Powder metallurgy techniques usually consist of the compression of a powder, and heating (sintering) it at a temperature below the melting point of the metal, to bind the particles together. Powder for the processes can be produced in a number of ways, including reducing metal compounds, electrolyzing metal-containing solutions, and mechanical crushing, as well as more complicated methods, including a variety of ways to fragment liquid metal into droplets, and condensation from metal vapor. Compaction is usually done with a die press, but can also be done with explosive shocks or placing a flexible container in a high-pressure gas or liquid. Sintering is usually done in a dedicated furnace, but can also be done in tandem with compression (hot isostatic compression), or with the use of electric currents.

Since the advent of industrial production-scale metal powder-based additive manufacturing in the 2010s, selective laser sintering and other metal additive manufacturing processes are a new category of commercially important powder metallurgy applications. China has become a major production hub for metal AM powders, supported by government-led R&D programmes and a rapidly expanding base of gas atomization capacity for alloys including titanium, nickel-based superalloys, and cobalt-chromium.

== Overview ==
The powder metallurgy "press and sinter" process generally consists of three basic steps: powder blending (or pulverisation), die compaction, and sintering. Compaction of the powder in the die is generally performed at room temperature. Sintering is the process of binding a material together with heat without liquefying it. It is usually conducted at atmospheric pressure and under carefully controlled atmosphere composition. To obtain special properties or enhanced precision, secondary processing like coining or heat treatment often follows.

One of the older such methods is the process of blending fine (<180 microns) metal powders with additives, pressing them into a die of the desired shape, and then sintering the compressed material together, under a controlled atmosphere. The metal powder is usually iron, and additives include a lubricant wax, carbon, copper, and/or nickel. This produces precise parts, normally very close to the die dimensions, but with 5–15% porosity, and thus sub-wrought steel properties. This method is still used to make around 1 Mt/y of structural components of iron-based alloys.

There are several other PM processes that have been developed over the last fifty years. These include:

- Powder forging: A "preform" made by the conventional "press and sinter" method is heated and then hot forged to full density, resulting in practically as-wrought properties.
- Hot isostatic pressing (HIP): Here the powder, normally gas atomized and spherical, is filled into a mould, usually a metallic "can". The can is vibrated, then evacuated and sealed. To sinter the powder, it is placed in a hot "isostatic press" for several hours, where it is heated to around 0.7 times the melting point, and subjected to an external gas pressure of ~100 MPa. This results in a shaped part of full density with as-wrought or better properties. HIP was invented in the 1950-60s and entered tonnage production in the 1970-80s. In 2015, it was used to produce ~25,000 t/y of stainless and tool steels, as well as important parts of superalloys for jet engines.
- Metal injection moulding (MIM): Here the powder, normally very fine (<25 microns) and spherical, is mixed with plastic or wax binder to near the maximum solid loading, typically around 65% volume, and injection moulded into a mould to form a "green" (with binder) part of complex geometry. This part is then heated or otherwise treated to remove the binder to give a "brown" (without binder) part. This part is then sintered and shrinks by ~18% to give a complex and 95–99% dense finished part (surface roughness ~3 microns). Invented in the 1970s, production has increased since 2000 with an estimated global volume in 2014 of 12,000 t worth €1265 million.
- Electric current assisted sintering (ECAS) technologies use electric currents to sinter powders. This reduces production time dramatically (it can take from 15 minutes to a few microseconds), does not require a long furnace heat, and allows near-theoretical densities, but it also has the drawback of simple shapes. Powders used in ECAS do not require binders because they can be directly sintered, without needing to be pre-pressed and compacted with binders. Moulds are designed for the final part shape since the powders sinter while filling the cavity under applied pressure. This avoids the problem of shape variations caused by non-isotropic sintering, as well as distortions caused by gravity at high temperatures. The most common of these technologies is hot pressing, which has been used to make diamond tools for the construction industry. As of 2018, only hot pressing and, in a more limited way, spark plasma sintering had achieved direct industrial application.
- Additive manufacturing (AM) is a relatively novel family of techniques that use metal powders (among other materials, such as plastics) to make parts by laser sintering or melting. The process was undergoing rapid growth as of 2015, and as of 2018 has been used predominantly for research, prototyping or advanced applications in the aerospace industry, though also in the biomedical, defence and automotive industries. It has been used in the aerospace industry because traditional processes are more time-consuming, difficult, and costly. Processes include 3D printing, selective laser sintering (SLS), selective laser melting (SLM), and electron beam melting (EBM).

== History and capabilities ==
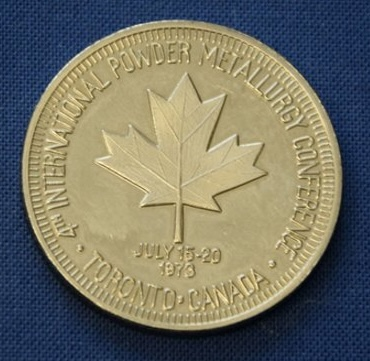
The head of a silver medallion commemorating the 4th international powder metallurgy conference in 1973

The history of powder metallurgy and the art of metal and ceramic sintering are intimately related to each other. Sintering involves the production of a hard solid metal or ceramic piece from a starting powder. The ancient Incas made jewelry and other artifacts from precious metal powders, though mass manufacturing of PM products did not begin until the mid or late 19th century. In these early manufacturing operations, iron was extracted by hand from a metal sponge following reduction and was then reintroduced as a powder for final melting or sintering.

A much wider range of products can be obtained from powder processes than from direct alloying of fused materials. In melting operations, the "phase rule" applies to all pure and combined elements and strictly dictates the distribution of liquid and solid phases which can exist for specific compositions. In addition, whole body melting of starting materials is required for alloying, thus imposing unwelcome chemical, thermal, and containment constraints on manufacturing. Unfortunately, the handling of aluminium/iron powders poses major problems. Other substances that are especially reactive with atmospheric oxygen, such as tin, are sinterable in special atmospheres or with temporary coatings.

In powder metallurgy or ceramics it is possible to fabricate components which otherwise would decompose or disintegrate. All considerations of solid-liquid phase changes can be ignored, so powder processes are more flexible than casting, extrusion, or forging techniques. Controllable characteristics of products prepared using various powder technologies include mechanical, magnetic, and other unconventional properties of such materials as porous solids, aggregates, and intermetallic compounds. Competitive characteristics of manufacturing processing (e.g. tool wear, complexity, or vendor options) also may be closely controlled.

=== Special products ===
Many special products are possible with powder metallurgy technology. A non-exhaustive list includes Al_{2}O_{3} whiskers coated with very thin oxide layers for improved refraction; iron compacts with Al_{2}O_{3} coatings for improved high-temperature creep strength; light bulb filaments made with powder technology; linings for friction brakes; metal glasses for high-strength films and ribbons; heat shields for spacecraft reentry into Earth's atmosphere; electrical contacts for handling large current flows; magnets; microwave ferrites; filters for gases; and bearings which can be infiltrated with lubricants.

Extremely thin films and tiny spheres exhibit high strength. One application of this observation is to coat brittle materials in whisker form with a submicrometre film of much softer metal (e.g. cobalt-coated tungsten). The surface strain of the thin layer places the harder metal under compression, so that when the entire composite is sintered the rupture strength increases markedly. With this method, strengths on the order of 2.8 GPa versus 550 MPa have been observed for, respectively, coated (25% cobalt) and uncoated tungsten carbides.

== Powder production ==
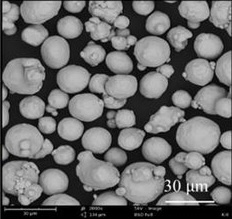
Closeup image of copper powder produced via gas atomization using air

Any fusible material can be atomized. Several techniques have been developed that permit large production rates of powdered particles, often with considerable control over the size ranges of the final grain population. Powders may be prepared by crushing, grinding, chemical reactions, or electrolytic deposition. The most commonly used powders are copper-base and iron-base materials.

Powders of the elements titanium, vanadium, thorium, niobium, tantalum, calcium, and uranium have been produced by high-temperature reduction of the corresponding nitrides and carbides. Iron, nickel, uranium, and beryllium submicrometre powders are obtained by reducing metallic oxalates and formates. Exceedingly fine particles also have been prepared by directing a stream of molten metal through a high-temperature plasma jet or flame, atomizing the material. Various chemical and flame-associated powdering processes are adopted in part to prevent serious degradation of particle surfaces by atmospheric oxygen.

Powder can be obtained through gas or water atomization, centrifugal atomization, chemically reducing particulate compounds, electrolytic deposition in appropriate conditions, simple pulverization and grinding, thermal decomposition of particulate hydrides or carbonyls, precipitation out of solution, and also condensation from vaporized metal.

=== Gas atomization ===
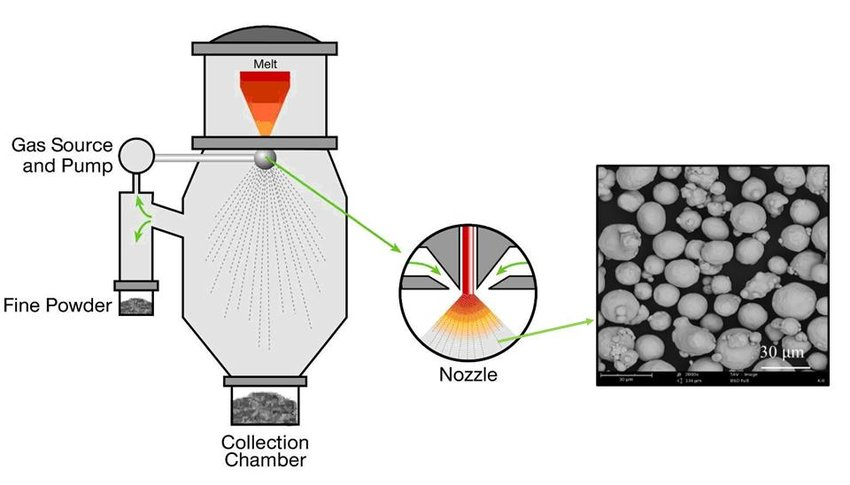
Diagram of an atomization process

Atomization is accomplished by forcing a molten metal stream through an orifice at moderate pressures. A gas is introduced into the metal stream just before it leaves the nozzle, serving to create turbulence as the entrained gas expands (due to heating) and exits into a large collection volume exterior to the orifice. The collection volume is filled with gas to promote further turbulence of the molten metal jet. Air and powder streams are segregated using gravity or cyclonic separation.

Simple atomization techniques are available in which liquid metal is forced through an orifice at a sufficiently high velocity to ensure turbulent flow. The usual performance index used is the Reynolds number. At low Re the liquid jet oscillates, but at higher velocities the stream becomes turbulent and breaks into droplets. Pumping energy is applied to droplet formation with very low efficiency (on the order of 1%) and control over the size distribution of the metal particles produced is rather poor. Other techniques such as nozzle vibration, nozzle asymmetry, multiple impinging streams, or molten-metal injection into ambient gas are all available to increase atomization efficiency, produce finer grains, and to narrow the particle size distribution. Unfortunately, it is difficult to eject metals through orifices smaller than a few millimeters in diameter, which in practice limits the minimum size of powder grains to approximately 10 μm. Atomization also produces a wide spectrum of particle sizes, necessitating downstream classification by screening and remelting a significant fraction of the grain boundary.

=== Centrifugal techniques ===
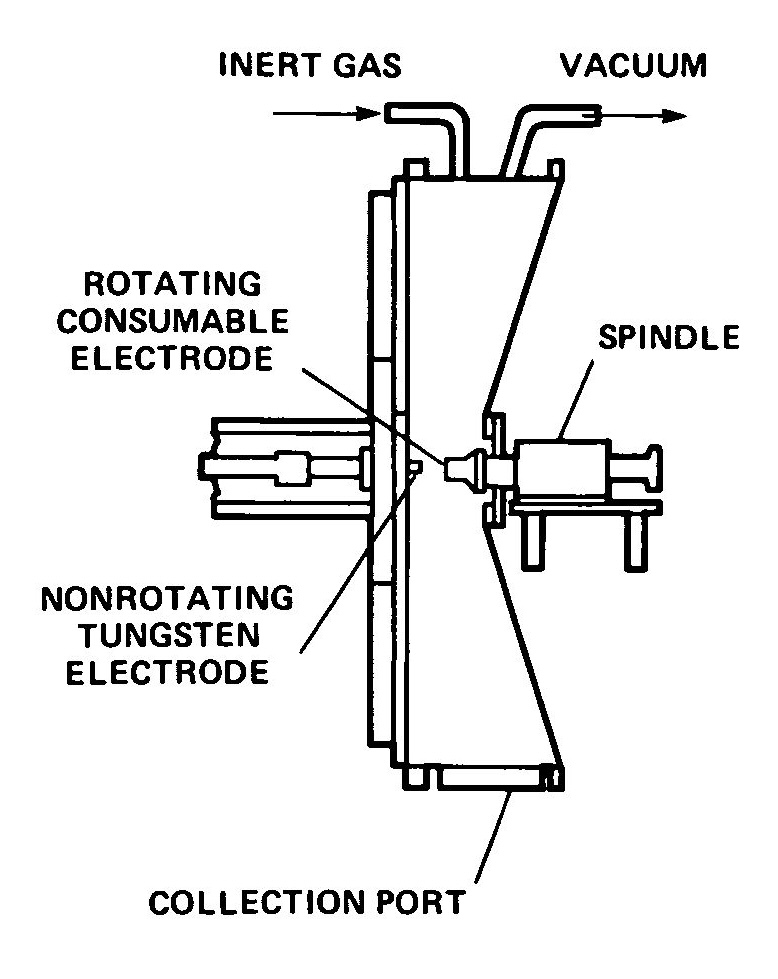
Schematic for centrifugal atomization

Centrifugal disintegration of molten particles offers one way around these problems. Extensive experience is available with iron, steel, and aluminium. Metal to be powdered is formed into a rod which is introduced into a chamber through a rapidly rotating spindle. Opposite the spindle tip is an electrode from which an arc is established which heats the metal rod. As the tip material fuses, the rapid rod rotation throws off tiny melt droplets which solidify before hitting the chamber walls. A circulating gas sweeps particles from the chamber. Similar techniques could be employed in space or on the Moon. The chamber wall could be rotated to force new powders into remote collection vessels, and the electrode could be replaced by a solar mirror focused at the end of the rod.

An alternative approach capable of producing a very narrow distribution of grain sizes but with low throughput consists of a rapidly spinning bowl heated to well above the melting point of the material to be powdered. Liquid metal, introduced onto the surface of the basin near the center at flow rates adjusted to permit a thin metal film to skim evenly up the walls and over the edge, breaks into droplets, each approximately the thickness of the film.

=== Water atomization ===
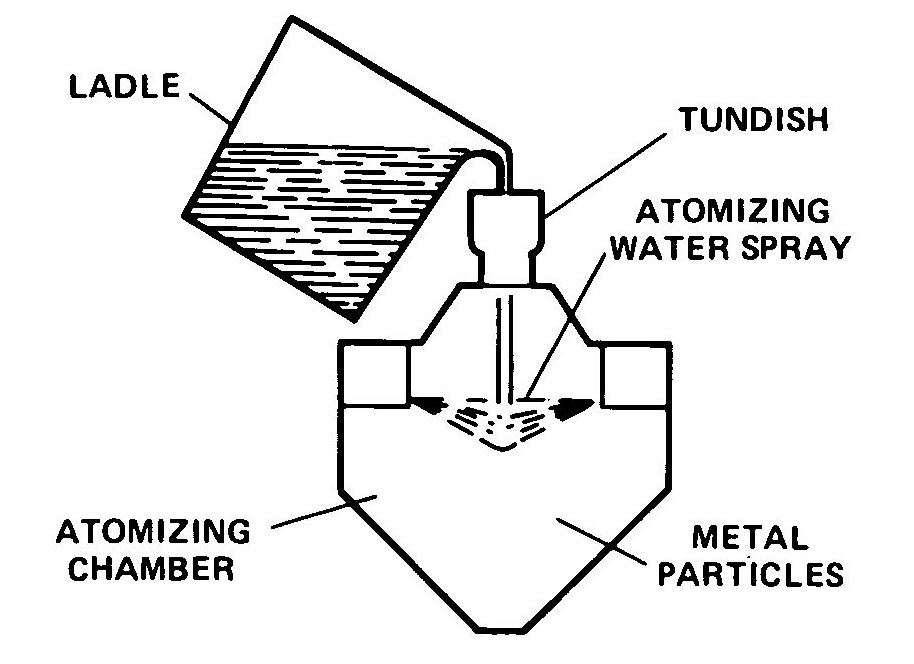
Schematic for water atomization

Another powder-production technique involves a thin jet of liquid metal intersected by high-speed streams of atomized water which break the jet into drops and cool the powder before it reaches the bottom of the bin. In subsequent operations the powder is dried. This is called water atomization. Water atomization cools and solidifies the metal particles more rapidly than gas atomization. Since the solidification rate is inversely proportional to the particle size, smaller particles can be made using water atomization. The smaller the particles, the more homogeneous the microstructure will be. Particles produced this way will also have a more irregular shape and the particle size distribution will be wider. In addition, some surface contamination can occur by oxidation skin formation. Powder can be reduced by some kind of pre-consolidation treatment, such as annealing used for the manufacture of ceramic tools.

== Powder compaction ==
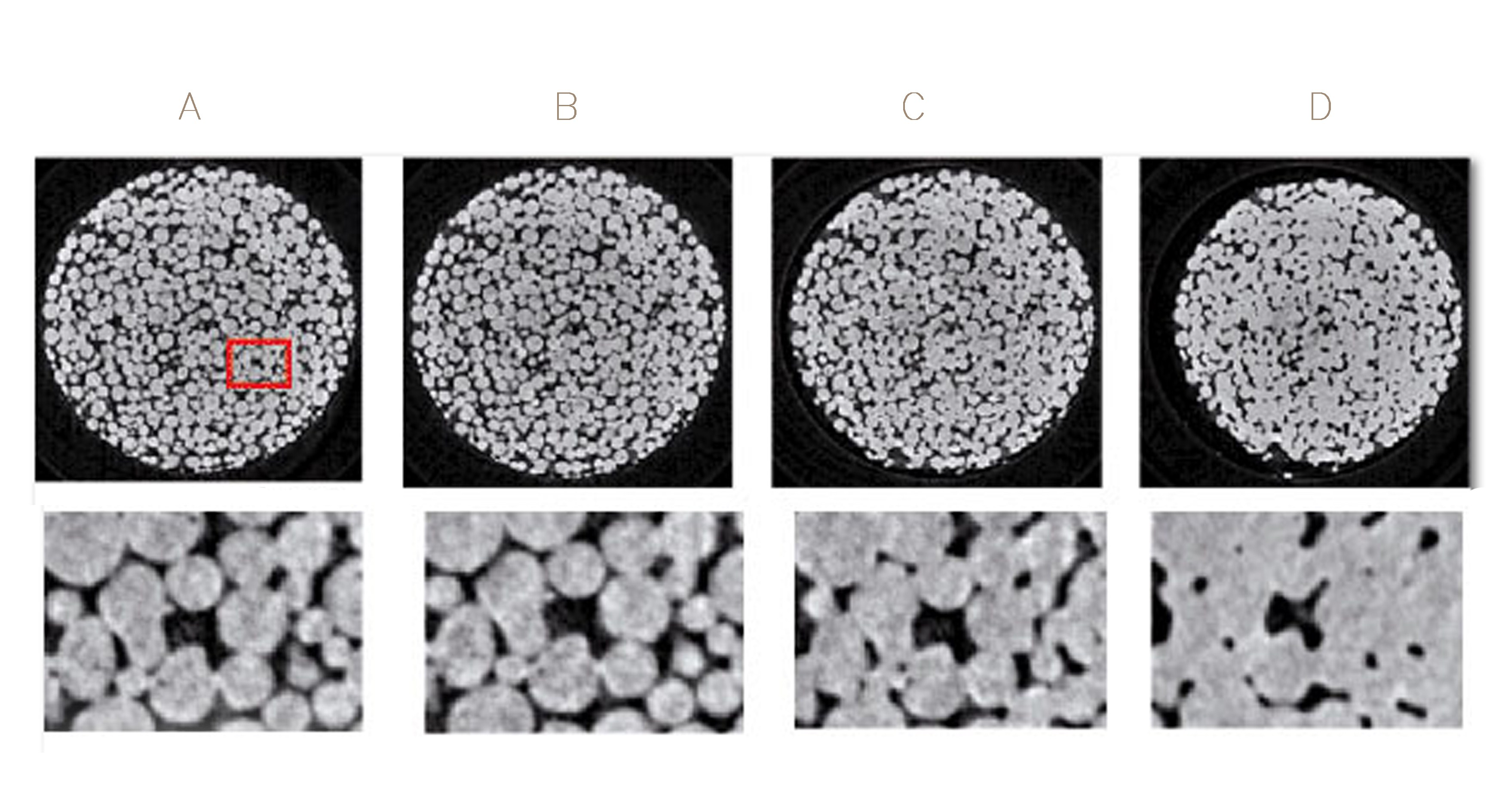
Diagram of stages of grain compaction

Powder compaction, one of the most critical steps in powder metallurgy processes, is the process of compacting metal powder through the application of high pressures. Most powder compaction is done with mechanical presses and rigid tools, but hydraulic and pneumatic techniques can also be used, as well as methods that combine compaction with sintering, like hot isostatic compaction. Traditional metalforming processes, including rolling, forging, extrusion, and swaging, are also used.

The density of the compacted powder increases with the amount of pressure applied. Typical pressures range from 80 to 1,000 psi (0.55 to 6.89 MPa), pressures from 1,000 to 1,000,000 psi (6.9 to 6,894.8 MPa) have been obtained. Pressure of 10 t/in^{2} to 50 t/in^{2} (150 MPa to 700 MPa) are commonly used for metal powder compaction. To attain the same compression ratio across a component with more than one level or height, it is necessary to work with multiple lower punches. A cylindrical workpiece is made by single-level tooling. A more complex shape can be made by the common multiple-level tooling.

=== Die pressing ===
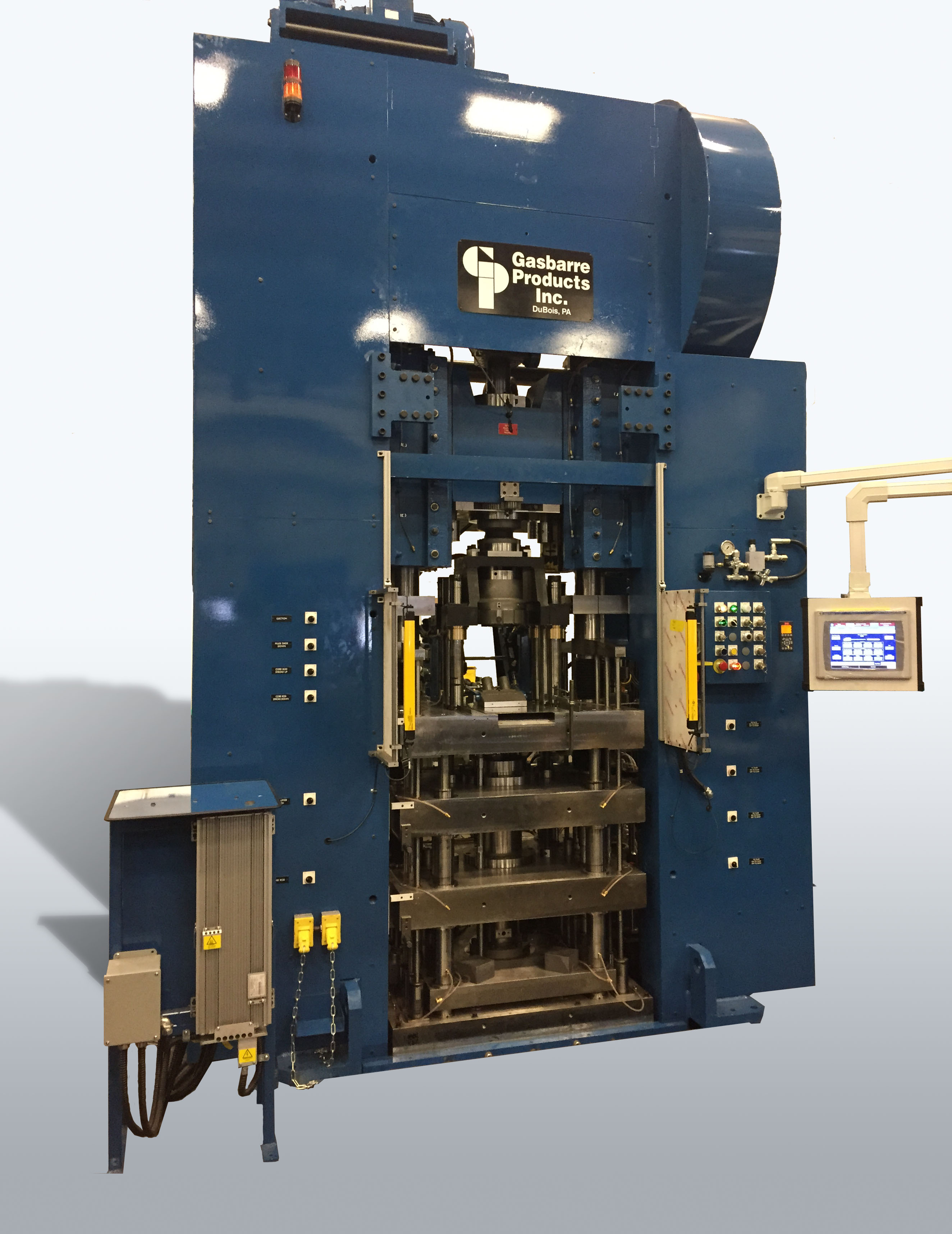
Powder compaction press

The dominant technology for the forming of products from powder materials, in terms of both tonnage quantities and numbers of parts produced, is die pressing. There are mechanical, servo-electrical and hydraulic presses available in the market, whereby the biggest powder throughput is processed by hydraulic presses. This forming technology involves the production cycle below, which offers a readily automated and high production rate process:

1. Filling a die cavity with a known volume of the powder feedstock, delivered from a fill shoe.
2. Compaction of the powder within the die with punches to form the compact. Generally, compaction pressure is applied through punches from both ends of the toolset in order to reduce the level of density gradient within the compact.
3. Ejection of the compact from the die, using the lower punch(es) withdrawal from the die.
4. Removal of the compact from the upper face of the die using the fill shoe in the fill stage of the next cycle, or an automation system or robot.

Typically the tools are held in the vertical orientation with the punch tool forming the bottom of the cavity. Probably the most basic consideration is being able to remove the part from the die after it is pressed, along with avoiding sharp corners in the design. Keeping the maximum surface area below 20 square inches (0.013 m^{2}) and the height-to-diameter ratio below 7-to-1 is recommended. Along with having walls thicker than 0.08 inches (2.0 mm) and keeping the adjacent wall thickness ratios below 2.5-to-1.

One of the major advantages of this process is its ability to produce complex geometries. Parts with undercuts and threads require a secondary machining operation. Typical part sizes range from 0.1 square inches (0.65 cm^{2}) to 20 square inches (130 cm^{2}). in area and from 0.1 to 4 inches (0.25 to 10.16 cm) in length. However, it is possible to produce parts that are less than 0.1 square inches (0.65 cm^{2}) and larger than 25 square inches (160 cm^{2}). in area and from a fraction of an inch (2.54 cm) to approximately 8 inches (20 cm) in length. Small mechanical presses can generally compact about 100 pieces per minute.

In die compaction, there are four major classes of tool styles: single-action compaction, used for thin, flat components; opposed double-action with two punch motions, which accommodates thicker components; double-action with floating die; and double-action withdrawal die. Double action classes give much better density distribution than single action. Tooling must be designed so that it will withstand the extreme pressure without deforming or bending. Tools must be made from materials that are polished and wear-resistant.

=== Shock consolidation ===
Shock consolidation, or dynamic consolidation, is an experimental technique of consolidating powders using high pressure shock waves. This technique is useful for very large products, including those over 3000 tons and larger than 100 square inches. These are commonly produced by impacting the workpiece with an explosively accelerated plate. Despite being researched for a long time, the technique still has some problems in controllability and uniformity. However, it offers some valuable potential advantages. As an example, consolidation occurs so rapidly that metastable microstructures may be retained.

=== Cold isostatic compaction ===
Isostatic powder compacting is an alternate method of powder compaction. In cold isostatic compaction, fine metal particles are placed into a flexible mould, which is then immersed in a high-pressure gas or liquid from all directions (isostatic). After sintering, this manufacturing process produces very little scrap metal and can be used to make many different shapes. The tolerances that this process can achieve in combination with sintering are very precise, ranging from +/- 0.008 inches (0.2 mm) for axial dimensions and +/- 0.020 inches (0.5 mm) for radial dimensions. This is the most efficient type of powder compacting (the following subcategories are also from this reference). This operation is generally only applicable on small production quantities, and although the cost of a mold is much lower than that of pressing dies, it is generally not reusable and the production time is much longer. Production rates are usually very low, but parts weighing up to 100 pounds can be effectively compacted. Because pressure is applied from all directions, lower compaction pressures are required to produce higher densities of powder in the end product.

Compacting pressures range from 15,000 psi (100,000 kPa) to 40,000 psi (280,000 kPa) for most metals and approximately 2,000 psi (14,000 kPa) to 10,000 psi (69,000 kPa) for non-metals. The density of isostatic compacted parts is 5% to 10% higher than with other powder metallurgy processes. Typical workpiece sizes range from 0.25 in (6.35 mm) to 0.75 in (19.05 mm) thick and 0.5 in (12.70 mm) to 10 in (254 mm) long. It is possible to compact workpieces that are between 0.0625 in (1.59 mm) and 5 in (127 mm) thick and 0.0625 in (1.59 mm) to 40 in (1,016 mm) long.

Advantages over standard powder compaction are the possibility of thinner walls and larger workpieces. The height-to-diameter ratio has no limitation. No specific limitations exist in wall thickness variations, undercuts, reliefs, threads, and cross holes. No lubricants are needed for isostatic powder compaction. The minimum wall thickness is 0.05 inches (1.27 mm) and the product can have a weight between 40 and 300 pounds (18 and 136 kg). There is 25 to 45% shrinkage of the powder after compacting.

Isostatic tools are available in three styles, free mold (wet-bag), coarse mold (damp-bag), and fixed mold (dry-bag). The free mold style is the traditional style of isostatic compaction and is not generally used for high production work. In free mold tooling the mold is removed and filled outside the canister. Damp bag is where the mold is located in the canister, yet filled outside. In fixed mold tooling, the mold is contained within the canister, which facilitates automation of the process.

== Sintering ==
Two grains being sintered together

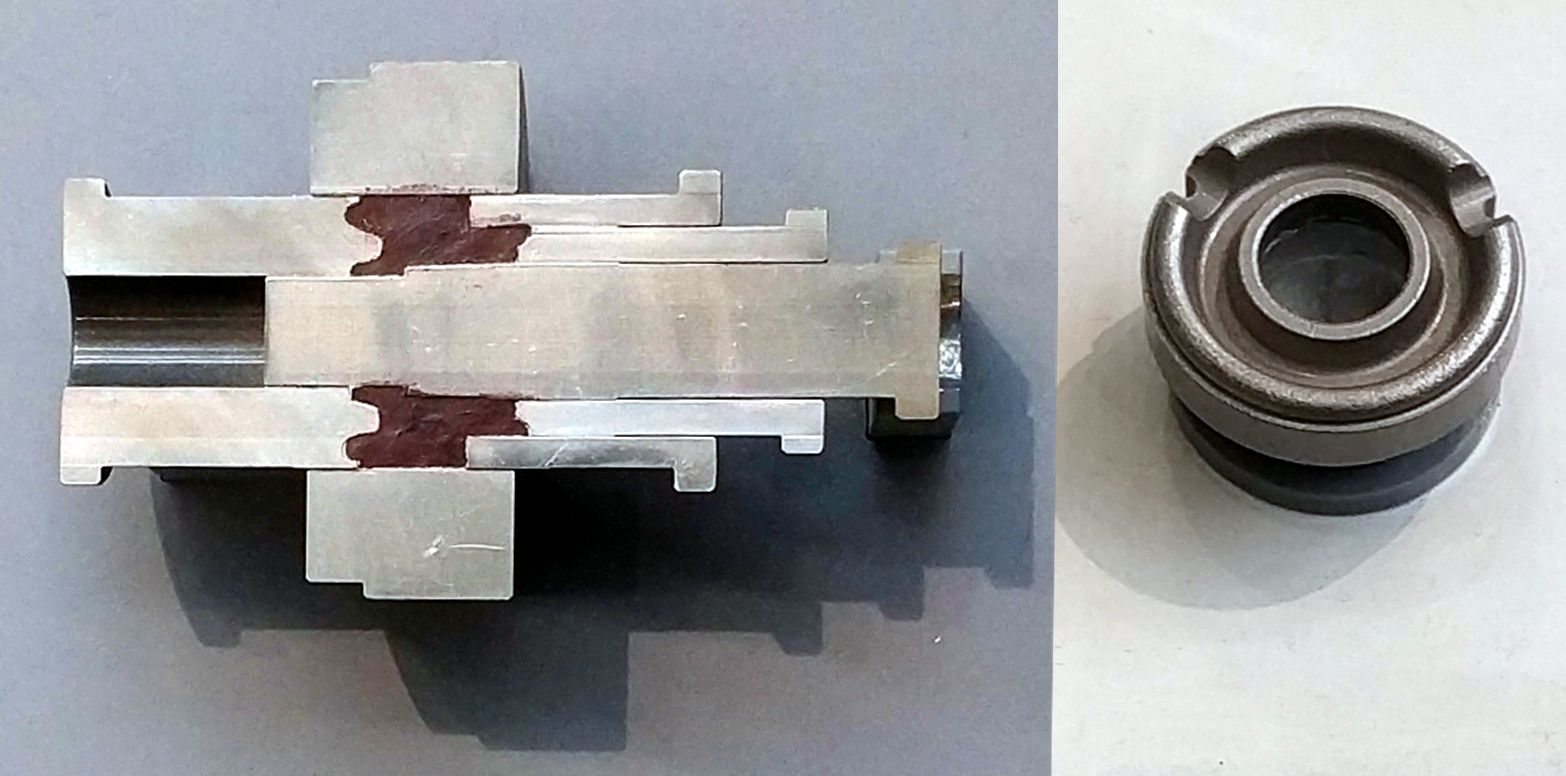
Cross section of sintering tool along with the sintered part

After compaction, powdered materials are heated in a controlled atmosphere in a process known as sintering. During this process, the surfaces of the particles are bonded and desirable properties are achieved.

Sintering of powder metals is a process in which particles under pressure chemically bond to themselves in order to form a coherent shape when exposed to a high temperature. The temperature in which the particles are sintered is most commonly below the melting point of the main component in the powder. If the temperature is above the melting point of a component in the powder metal part, the liquid of the melted particles fills the pores. This type of sintering is known as liquid-state sintering. A major challenge with sintering in general is knowing the effect of the process on the dimensions of the compact particles. This is especially difficult for tooling purposes in which specific dimensions may be needed. It is most common for the sintered part to shrink and become denser, but it can also expand or experience no net change.

The main driving force for solid-state sintering is an excess of surface-free energy. The process of solid-state sintering is complex and dependent on the material and furnace (temperature and gas) conditions. There are six main stages that sintering processes can be grouped in which may overlap with one another: 1 initial bonding among particles, 2) neck growth, 3) pore channel closure, 4) pore rounding, 5) densification or pore shrinkage, and 6) pore coarsening. The main mechanisms present in these stages are evaporation, condensation, grain boundaries, volume diffusion, and plastic deformation.

During this process, a number of characteristics are increased including the strength, ductility, toughness, and electrical and thermal conductivity of the material. If different elemental powders are compact and sintered, the material would form into alloys and intermetallic phases. As the pore sizes decrease, the density of the material will increase. As stated above, this shrinkage is a huge problem in making parts or tooling in which particular dimensions are required. The shrinkage of test materials is monitored and used to manipulate the furnace conditions or to oversize the compact materials in order to achieve the desired dimensions. Although, sintering does not deplete the compact part of porosity. In general, powder metal parts contain five to twenty-five percent porosity after sintering.

=== General sintering furnace ===
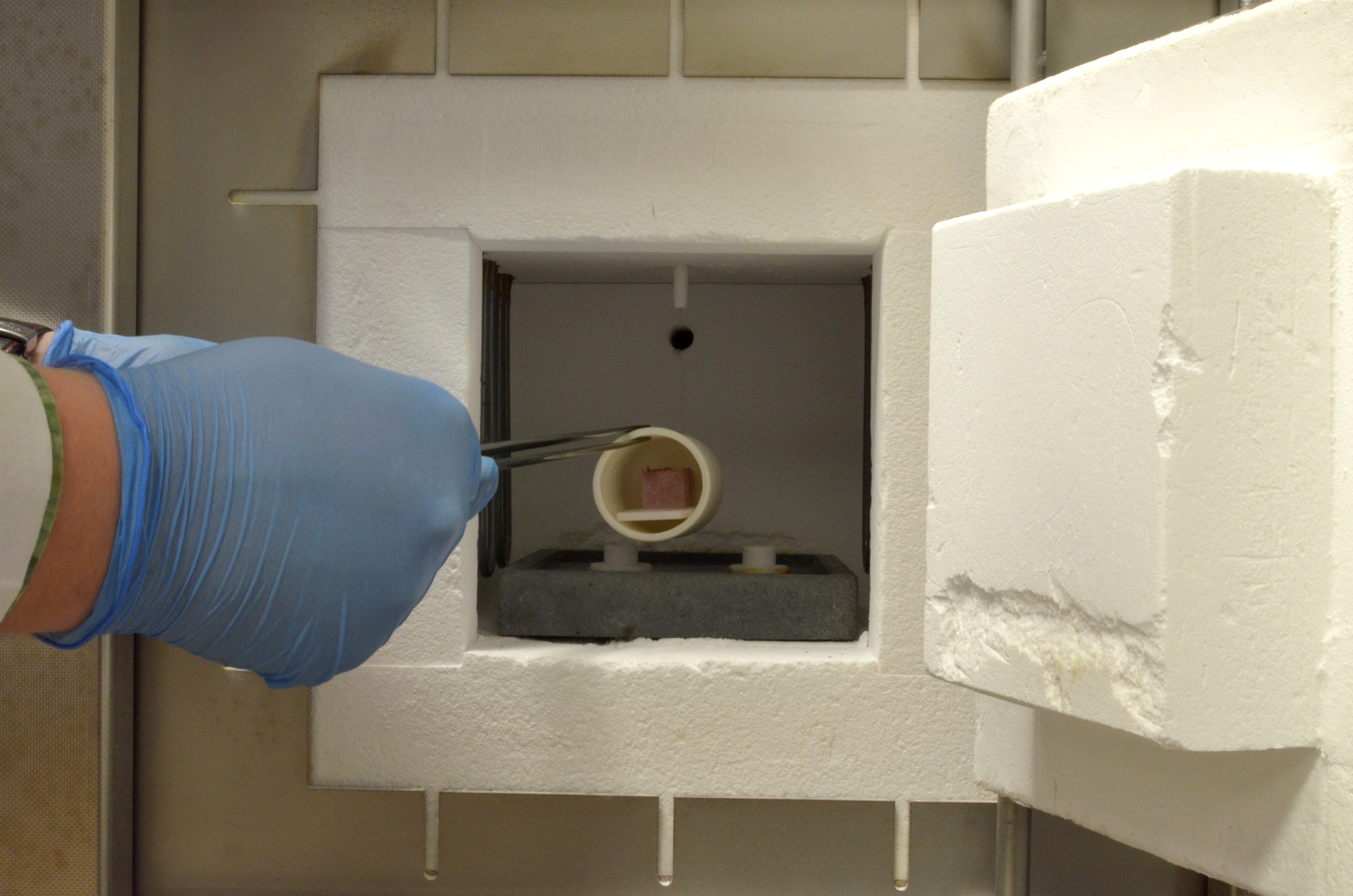
Programmable sintering furnace with a controllable temperature program, used to sinter ceramics

Most sintering furnaces contain three zones with three different properties that help to carry out the six steps above. The first zone, commonly coined the burn-off or purge stage, is designed to combust air, burn any contaminants such as lubricant or binders, and slowly raise the temperature of the compact materials. If the temperature of the compact parts is raised too quickly, the air in the pores will be at a very high internal pressure which could lead to expansion or fracture of the part. The second zone, known as the high-temperature stage, is used to produce solid-state diffusion and particle bonding. The material is seeking to lower its surface energy and does so by moving toward the points of contact between particles. The contact points become larger and eventually a solid mass with small pores is created. The third zone, also called the cooling period, is used to cool down the parts while still in a controlled atmosphere. This is an important zone as it prevents oxidation from immediate contact with the air or a phenomenon known as rapid cooling. All of the three stages must be carried out in a controlled atmosphere containing no oxygen. Hydrogen, nitrogen, dissociated ammonia, and cracked hydrocarbons are common gases pumped into the furnace zones providing a reducing atmosphere, preventing oxide formation.

=== Hot isostatic pressing ===
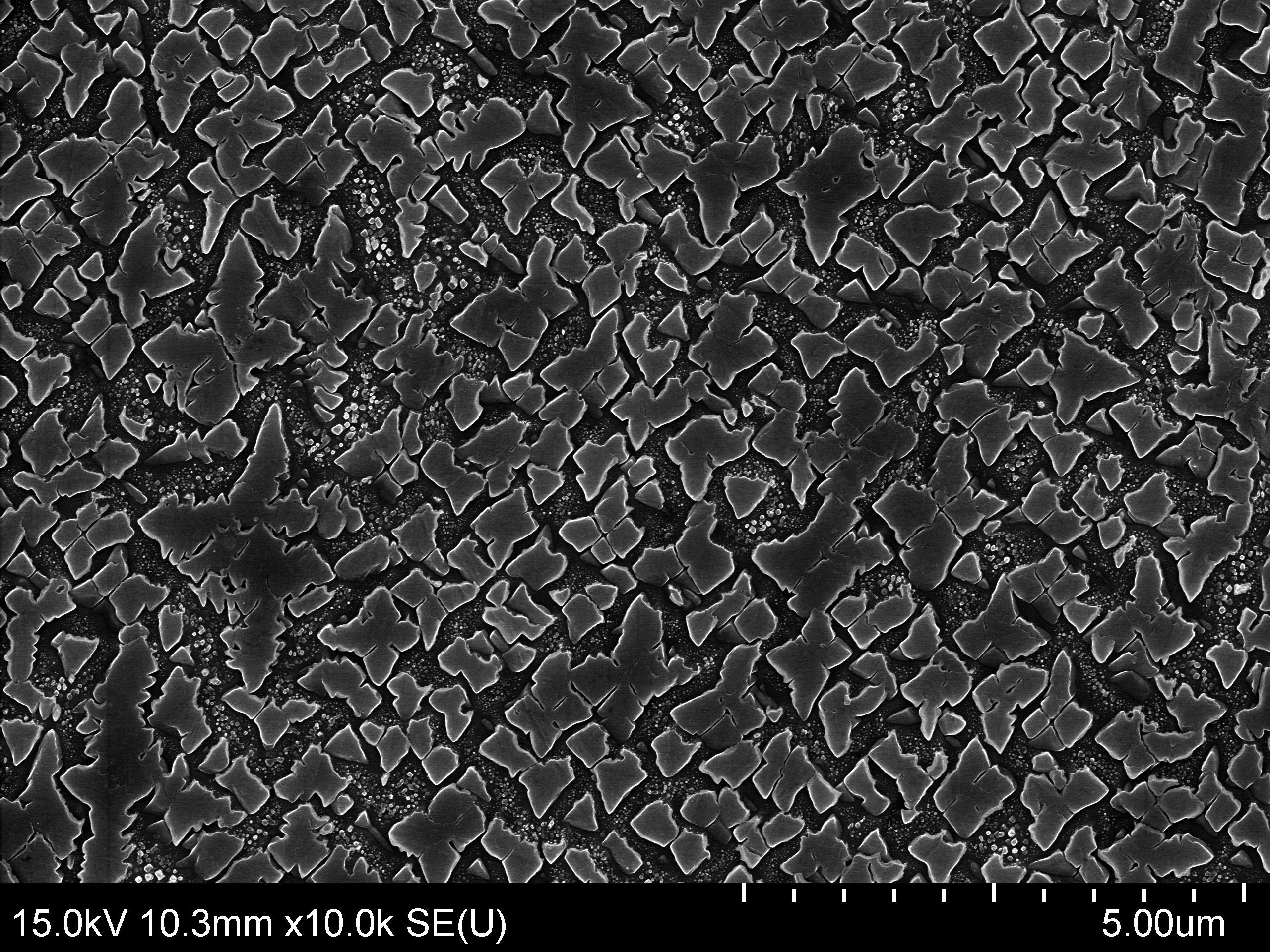
Microstructure of nickel alloy after hot isostatic pressing

Hot isostatic pressing (HIP) compresses and sinters the part simultaneously by applying heat on the order of 2300 °F (1250 °C), in the case of iron, or 2750 °F (1500 °C) in the case of nickel alloys. This procedure, together with explosion-driven compressive techniques is used extensively in the production of high-temperature and high-strength parts such as turbine disks for jet engines. In most applications of powder metallurgy the compact is hot-pressed, heated to a temperature above which the materials cannot remain work-hardened. Hot pressing lowers the pressures required to reduce porosity and speeds welding and grain deformation processes. It also permits better dimensional control of the product, lessens sensitivity to physical characteristics of starting materials, and allows powder to be compressed to higher densities than with cold pressing, resulting in higher strength. Negative aspects of hot pressing include shorter die life, slower throughput because of powder heating, and the frequent necessity for protective atmospheres or simple vacuum during forming and cooling stages.

HIP produces products often of higher quality than other processes. However, HIP is expensive, and generally unnattractive for high-volume production, due to the high cost of placing the powder in a flexible isolating medium that can withstand the temperatures and pressures (canning) and then removing it from that medium (decanning), as well as the long time periods involve, which can range from 6 to 8 hours.

=== Electric current assisted sintering ===
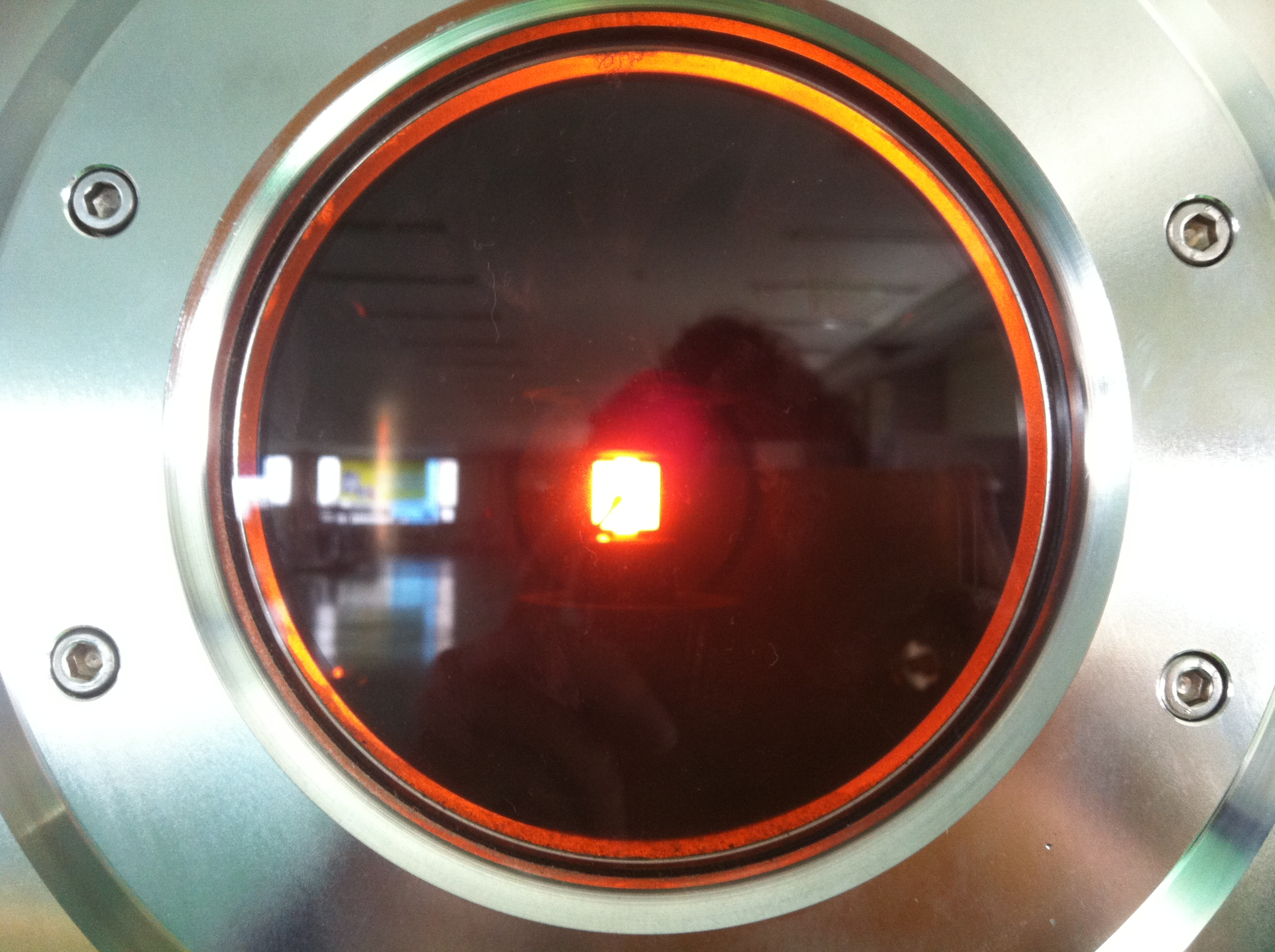
Spark plasma sintering, a kind of electric current assisted sintering that involves neither sparks nor plasma

These techniques employ electric currents to drive or enhance sintering. A combination of mechanical pressure and electrical current, passed through either the powder or the container, significantly reduces the sintering time compared to conventional solutions. There are many classifications of these techniques, but they can be divided into two main categories: resistance sintering techniques, which apply lower voltages and currents and take on the from around ten seconds to ten minutes; and electric discharge sintering, which use capacitor banks to achieve higher currents and voltages, and take from tens of microseconds to tens of milliseconds. Resistance sintering techniques include spark plasma sintering (SPS), plasma-activated sintering (PAS), and pulse electric current sintering (PECS). electric discharge sintering techniques include capacitor discharge sintering. Currently, spark plasma sintering is currently the most commonly used method of electric pulse consolidation in general.

Resistance sintering currents usually reach about 1 kA per square centimer, while electric discharge sintering voltages of up to several kilovolts also require very high currents, over 10 kA per square centimer. Resistance sintering techniques are consolidation methods based on temperature, where heating of the mold and of the powders is accomplished through electric currents, usually with a characteristic processing time of 15 to 30 minutes. On the other hand, electric discharge sintering methods rely on high-density currents (from 0.1 to 1 kA/mm^{2}) to directly sinter electrically conductive powders, with a characteristic time between tens of microseconds to hundreds of milliseconds.

== Continuous powder processing ==
Strictly, the phrase "continuous process" should be used only to describe modes of manufacturing which could be extended indefinitely in time. Normally, however, the term refers to processes whose products are much longer in one physical dimension than in the other two. Compression, rolling, and extrusion are the most common examples.

=== Compression ===
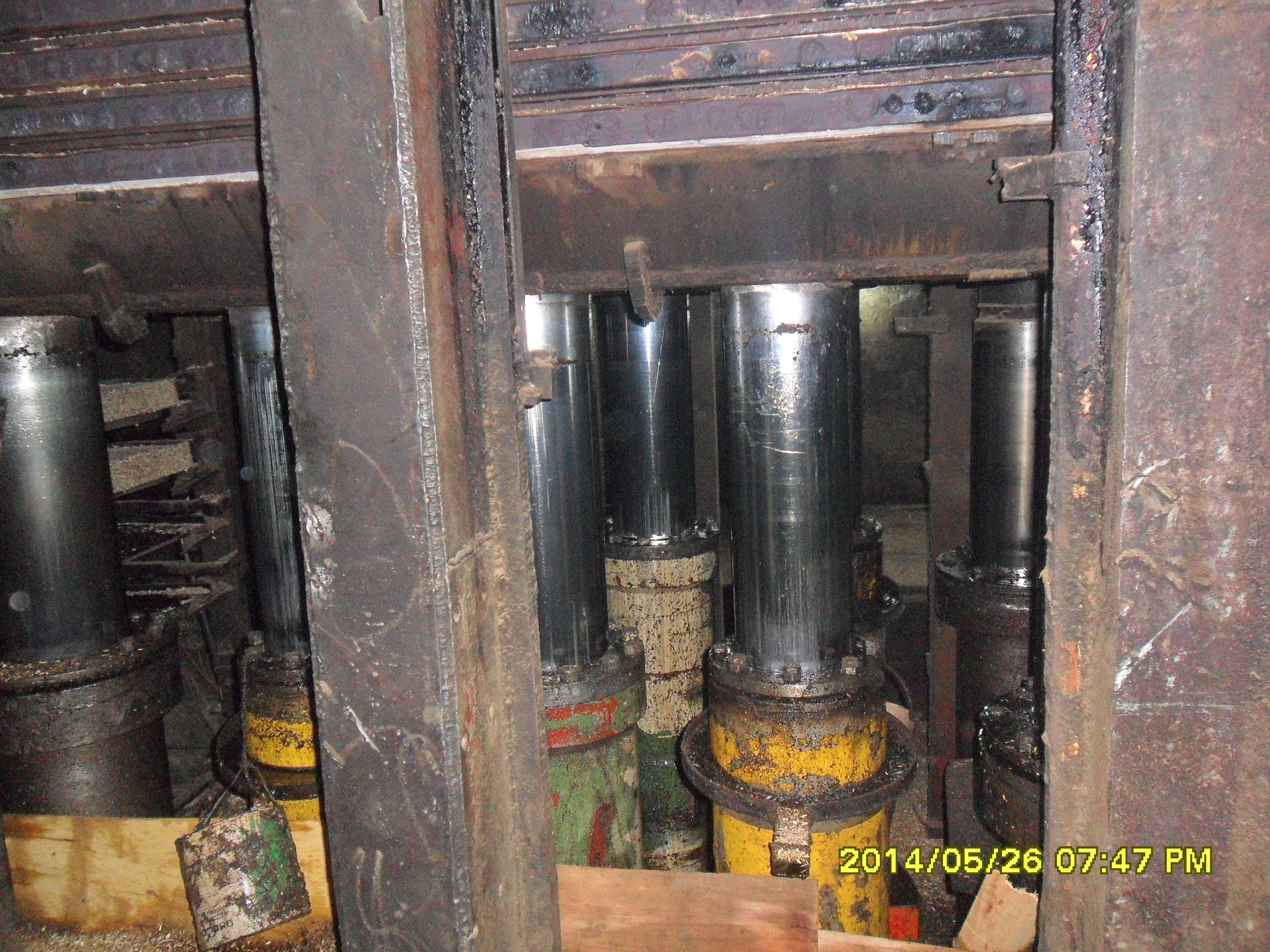
Hydraulic cylinders, or hydraulic rams, used in the hot press of a particle board machine

In a simple compression process, powder flows from a bin onto a two-walled channel and is repeatedly compressed vertically by a horizontally stationary punch. After stripping the compress from the conveyor, the compacted mass is introduced into a sintering furnace. An even easier approach is to spray powder onto a moving belt and sinter it without compression. However, good methods for stripping cold-pressed materials from moving belts are hard to find. One alternative that avoids the belt-stripping difficulty altogether is the manufacture of metal sheets using opposed hydraulic rams, although weakness lines across the sheet may arise during successive press operations.

=== Rolling ===
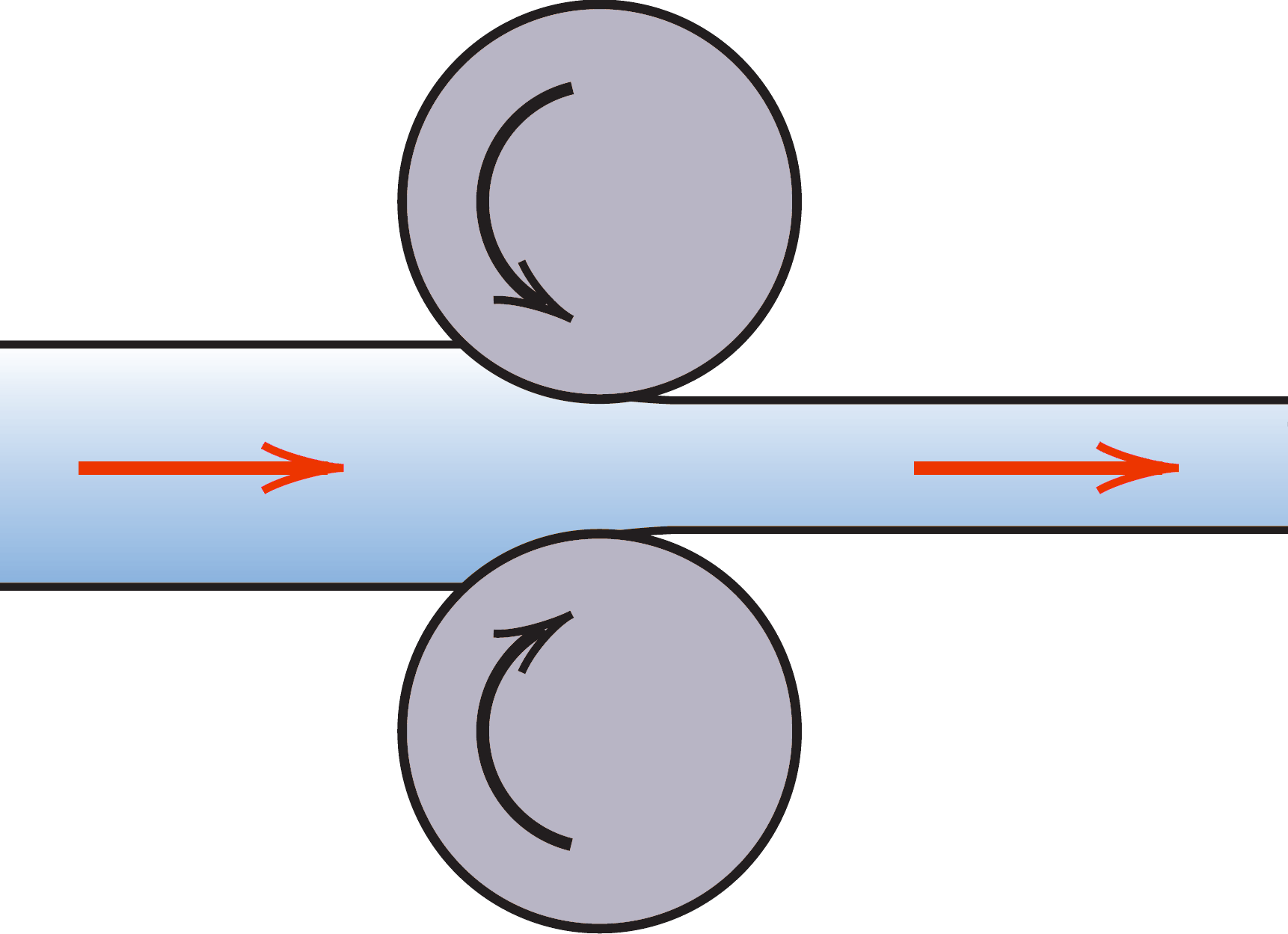
Diagram of metal rolling

Powders can also be rolled to produce sheets. The powdered metal is fed into a two-high rolling mill, (Note: "Two-high" means there are two wheels involved in the rolling. "Three-high" would involve three wheels rolling in different directions stacked on top of each other.) and is compacted into strip form at up to 100 feet per minute (0.5 m/s). The strip is then sintered and subjected to another rolling and further sintering. Rolling is commonly used to produce sheet metal for electrical and electronic components, as well as coins. Considerable work also has been done on rolling multiple layers of different materials simultaneously into sheets.

=== Extrusion ===
Extrusion processes are of two general types. In one type, the powder is mixed with a binder or plasticizer at room temperature; in the other, the powder is extruded at elevated temperatures without fortification. Extrusions with binders are used extensively in the preparation of tungsten-carbide composites. Tubes, complex sections, and spiral drill shapes are manufactured in extended lengths and diameters varying in the range 0.5–300 mm (0.020–11.811 in). Hard metal wires of 0.1 mm (0.0039 in) diameter have been drawn from powder stock. At the opposite extreme, large extrusions on a tonnage basis may be feasible.

For softer, easier-to-form metals such as aluminium and copper alloys continuous extrusion may also be performed using processes such as conform or continuous rotary extrusion. These processes use a rotating wheel with a groove around its circumference to drive the loose powder through a forming die. Through a combination of high pressure and a complex strain path the powder particles deform, generate a large amount of frictional heat and bond together to form a bulk solid. Theoretically, fully continuous operation is possible as long as the powder can be fed into the process.

There appears to be no limitation to the variety of metals and alloys that can be extruded, provided the temperatures and pressures involved are within the capabilities of die materials. Extrusion lengths may range from 3 to 30 m and diameters from 0.2 to 1 m. Modern presses are largely automatic and operate at high speeds (on the order of m/s).

== Hazards ==
The special materials and processes used in powder metallurgy can pose hazards to life and property. The high surface-area-to-volume ratio of the powders can increase their chemical reactivity in biological exposures (for example, inhalation or ingestion), and increases the risk of dust explosions. Metals that are generally unreactive can quickly catch fire when the surface area is high. For instance, steel is generally not flammable, but steel wool quickly catches fire. Materials considered relatively benign in bulk can pose special toxicological risks when in a finely divided form. Inhalation of heavy metals can result in many health issues. Lead and cadmium are generally toxic, and cobalt can cause asthma and fibrosis in sensitive individuals.

=== Risks of aluminium metal powder ===
Aluminium powders are known to cause lung fibrosis among people who work with it in manufacturing plants. According to the CDC, workers who are exposed to large amounts of aluminium can have other lung problems and abnormal chest X-rays. Some workers have also had decreased performance in neurological tests. Exposure to aluminum can irritate the skin and eyes.

Aluminium powder is also highly flammable.

Besides the risks of metal powder itself, there are many hazards during the production process as well.

== See also ==
- Electro sinter forging
- Global Powder Metallurgy Property Database
- Mechanical powder press
- Selective laser melting
- Selective laser sintering
- Sintering
- Spark plasma sintering
- Spray forming

== Cited sources ==
- DeGarmo, E. P. (2008). Materials and Processes in Manufacturing (PDF) (10th ed.). Wiley. ISBN 9780470055120. Archived from the original (PDF) on 2019-10-09.
