= Isostatic =

The term isostatic may refer to:

- Isostatic depression in geodynamics
- Isostatic powder compaction in metallurgy and ceramic engineering
- Isostatic press in manufacturing

== See also ==
- Isostasy in geology: gravitational equilibrium between the Earth's lithosphere and asthenosphere
- Statically determinate structures in physics and engineering
