= Room temperature (disambiguation) =

Room temperature is the range of air temperatures most people find comfortable indoors.

Room temperature may also refer to:

- Room Temperature (album), a 1990 album by Peter Hammill
- Room Temperature, a 1993 album by Simon Joyner
- Room Temperature (novel), a 1990 novel by Nicholson Baker
- Room Temperature, a 2025 film directed by Dennis Cooper and Zac Farley

== See also ==
- Room-temperature densification method, a method for ceramics fabrication
- Room-temperature superconductor, a hypothetical material
