= Lithium molybdate =

Names
- Other names: Lithium molybdate(VI); Dilithium molybdate; Dilithium dioxido(dioxo)molybdenum

Identifiers
CAS Number	13568-40-6
3D model (JSmol)	Interactive image
ChemSpider	3346702
ECHA InfoCard	100.033.601
EC Number	236-977-7
PubChem CID	6093689
CompTox Dashboard (EPA)	DTXSID80894904
- InChI: InChI=1S/2Li.Mo.4O/q2*+1;;;;2*-1 Key: NMHMDUCCVHOJQI-UHFFFAOYSA-N; InChI=1/2Li.Mo.4O/q2*+1;;;;2*-1/r2Li.MoO4/c;;2-1(3,4)5/q2*+1;-2 Key: NMHMDUCCVHOJQI-FFXFYZCHAF
- SMILES: [Li+].[Li+].[O-][Mo]([O-])(=O)=O

Properties
Chemical formula	Li_{2}MoO_{4}
Molar mass	173.82 g/mol
Appearance	white odorless powder hygroscopic or transparent crystal
Density	3.07 g/cm^{3} (pure crystal), 2.66 g/cm^{3} (hydrated crystal)
Melting point	705 °C (1,301 °F; 978 K)
Solubility in water	very soluble

Structure
Crystal structure	Trigonal
Space group	R3 (No. 146)
Lattice constant	a = 1.432 nm, c = 0.956 nm
Formula units (Z)	18 formula per cell
Coordination geometry	Tetrahedral

Hazards
- GHS labelling
Pictograms	(GHS07: Exclamation mark)
Signal word	Warning
Hazard statements	H315, H319, H335
Precautionary statements	P261, P264, P271, P280, P302+P352, P304+P340, P305+P351+P338, P312, P321, P332+P313, P337+P313, P362, P403+P233, P405, P501
NFPA 704 (fire diamond)	3 0 1

Related compounds
Other cations	sodium molybdate
- Except where otherwise noted, data are given for materials in their standard state (at 25 °C [77 °F], 100 kPa). verify (what is ?) Infobox references

Lithium molybdate is an inorganic compound with the chemical formula Li_{2}MoO_{4}. It is a white solid forming trigonal crystals.

== Structure ==
At standard conditions it is isostructural to phenacite (Be_{2}SiO_{4}). Phrase transformations occur at elevated temperatures.

== Preparation ==
Lithium molybdate can be prepared by reacting lithium carbonate and molybdenum trioxide by a solid-state reaction route followed by recrystallization.

== Related compounds ==
A related lithium molybdenum oxide (Li_{2}MoO_{2}) with a hexagonal layered structure can be prepared by reacting Li_{2}MoO_{4} with Mo metal at 900 °C. It is isomorphous with α-NaFeO_{2} (space group R3m, a = b = 2.8663 Å, c = 15.4743 Å, Z = 3).

== Uses ==
Lithium molybdate is used in petroleum cracking catalysts. In the oxidative conversion of n-hexane, the addition of molybdenum species to a Li/MgO catalyst results in the formation of lithium molybdate mixed oxide phases. This diminishes the formation of Li_{2}CO_{3} in the catalyst, maintaining high surface area and stability.

Lithium molybdate is used as corrosion inhibitor.

Li_{2}MoO_{4} crystals have been found applicable for cryogenic phonon-scintillation detectors, which are used to investigate some rare nuclear processes.

The use of Li_{2}MoO_{4} ceramics for antennas has been studied due to their low loss dielectric properties and the possibility to fabricate them by a room-temperature densification method instead of conventional sintering. It has been used with hollow glass microspheres (HGMS) to make low permittivity composite for lenses in lens antennas.
