= Chokshi =

Chokshi is a surname. Another way to spell this surname "Choksi". Notable people with the surname include:

- Atul Chokshi (born 1958), Indian materials scientist, metallurgist and academic
- Dave A. Chokshi, Commissioner of Health of the City of New York
- Roshani Chokshi, American writer
