= Global Powder Metallurgy Property Database =

Online power metallurgy database

The Global Powder Metallurgy Database (GPMD) is an online searchable database which launched in 2004. It was developed as the result of a joint project between leading regional powder metallurgy (PM) trade associations, the EPMA in Europe and its sister organisations in Japan (JPMA) and North America (MPIF). It was created to address the lack of readily accessible design data, which had been a significant impediment to the wider application of PM products. The Asian PM Association (APMA) joined as a database partner in 2020.

Primarily aimed at designers and engineers in the industries using PM products, it is designed to provide verified physical, mechanical and fatigue data for a range of commercially available PM materials. This culminated in the initial launch of the database at the PM World Congress in Vienna in October 2004. The content of the database, at this launch, was restricted to data on low alloy ferrous and stainless steel PM structural part grades and bronze and iron-based PM bearing grades.

However, enhancement and extension of content and searching capability has been an ongoing process ever since. In January 2007, the content was expanded with the addition of data on non-ferrous PM structural part grades, followed, in March 2007, by the introduction of a new section covering data on Metal Injection Moulding (MIM) materials.

The latest extension to capability involves making full SN Fatigue Curve "pages" (comprising SN curves and details of individual test points) accessible to searchers. The initial content comprises over 130 SN Curve pages, covering a range of Fe-Cu-C grades and based on published information that has been analysed and collated by the group led by Professor Paul Beiss at the Technical University of Aachen. The collated SN curves cover a range of material processing conditions and density levels and a range of fatigue testing conditions (fatigue loading mode, mean stress level and notch factor).

In assembling the GPMD content, a broad range of mechanical, fatigue and physical property data has been collected from the associations’ memberships and rigorously evaluated by regional accreditation committees. However, the database's primary targets are designers and material specifiers in end-user industries who may have no prior knowledge of PM. Therefore, the bulk of the search structure has been designed to take such a searcher to the point where they can decide that they ought to contact a PM parts manufacturer to discuss a potential application in more detail. The database is maintained by the European Powder Metallurgy Association (EPMA) and serves as a reference for designers evaluating powder metallurgy as an alternative to conventional manufacturing.
