= Capacitor discharge sintering =

Fast electric current assisted sintering process

Capacitor discharge sintering (CDS) is an electric current assisted sintering (ECAS) technique. The technique is based on storage of electrostatic energy in a high voltage capacitor bank, and discharge into the sintering apparatus at low voltage (<30 V) and high current through step-down transformers on a pre-compacted powder compact which is kept under pressure. The sintering mould and Electrodes are similar to those employed in field assisted sintering techniques (FAST) such as spark plasma sintering and single electromagnetic pulse sintering technologies.

The method, analogous to resistive sintering, is a direct evolution of a welding technology named Capacitor Discharge Welding (Kondensator-Impulsschweißen). CDS seems like an improvement of the less powerful capacitor discharge compaction patented by W.Knoess and M.Schlemmer (EP 0671232, US Patent 5529746).

Advantages of the technique are:

- short sintering time (less than one second)
- no need for a controlled atmosphere even during sintering of highly reactive materials such as titanium
- the ability to obtain metastable and nanocrystalline materials

== Disambiguation ==
The technique has been studied by Element Six under the name of electro-discharge sintering. This name has been adopted by many authors in the past to describe a range of different technologies which typically adopt very high voltages and completely different machines. For this reason the technique which employs low voltages and high currents adapted from capacitor discharge welding has been named capacitor discharge sintering. Other authors also refer to this technology as spark plasma compaction (in reference to the well known spark plasma sintering with whom it has in common only the use of electric currents).

== Developments ==
Capacitor discharge sintering is at an experimental/research stage of development in Germany at the Ruhr-Universität Bochum where a prototype machine is installed.

Schematics of pressure and electric current during a typical cycle of capacitor discharge sintering. The characteristic time of the discharge is from 20 to 40 ms.
