= Atul Chokshi =

Indian materials scientist, metallurgist and academic

- Born: 24 May 1958 (age 68); India
- Education: IIT Madras; University of Southern California; University of California, Davis
- Known for: Studies on high temperature deformation and failure of ceramic materials
- Awards: 1998 Swarnajayanti Presidential Young Scientist Award; 2000 Materials Research Society of India Medal; 2001 IIM Metallurgist of the Year Award; 2003 Shanti Swarup Bhatnagar Prize; 2004 Citation Laureate Award; 2006 IIM G. D. Birla Award; 2008 IITM Distinguished Alumnus Award
- Scientific career
- Fields: Materials science; Metallurgy
- Workplaces: University of California, San Diego; Indian Institute of Science

Atul Harish Chokshi (born 1958) is an Indian materials scientist, metallurgical engineer and a professor at the Department of Materials Engineering of the Indian Institute of Science. He is known for his studies on high temperature deformation and failure of ceramic materials and is an elected fellow of all the three major Indian science academies viz. the National Academy of Sciences, India, Indian Academy of Sciences, and Indian National Science Academy as well as the Indian National Academy of Engineering. The Council of Scientific and Industrial Research, the apex agency of the Government of India for scientific research, awarded him the Shanti Swarup Bhatnagar Prize for Science and Technology, one of the highest Indian science awards for his contributions to Engineering Sciences in 2003. (Note: Long link - please select award year to see details)

== Biography ==
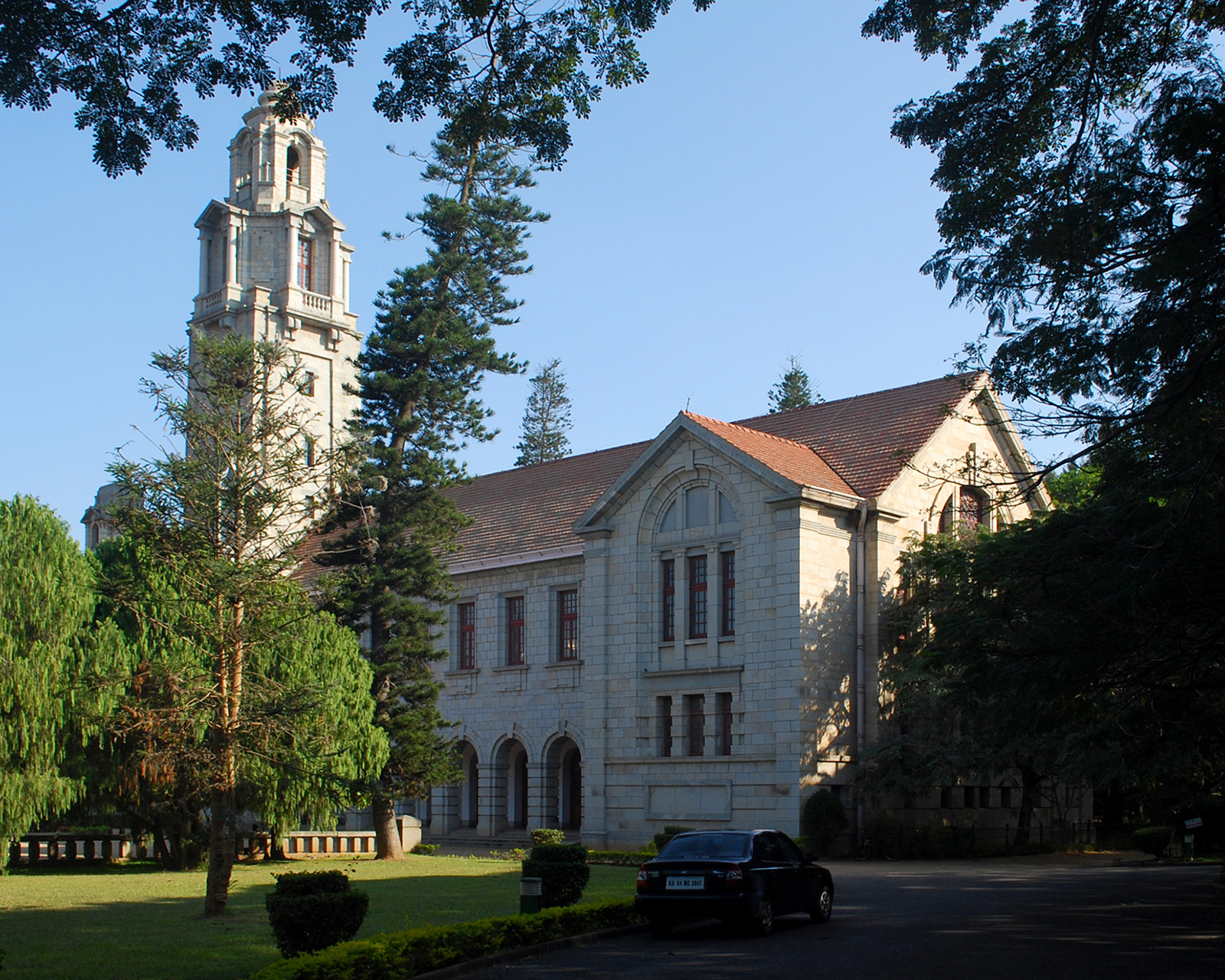
Indian Institute of Science

Atul Chokshi, born on 24 March 1958, gained his bachelor's degree (BTech) in metallurgical engineering from the Indian Institute of Technology, Madras in 1980 and went to the US for higher studies. Joining the University of Southern California, he earned a master's degree (MS) in 1981, and followed it up with a PhD in material science in 1984. He continued at the university for his post-doctoral work during 1984–1986 and did further researches at University of California, Davis from 1986 to 1988. That year, he moved to the University of California, San Diego to take up the position of a faculty and served the university until 1994 when he returned to India to join the Indian Institute of Science as an associate professor at the Department of Materials Engineering where he holds the position of a professor.

== Legacy ==
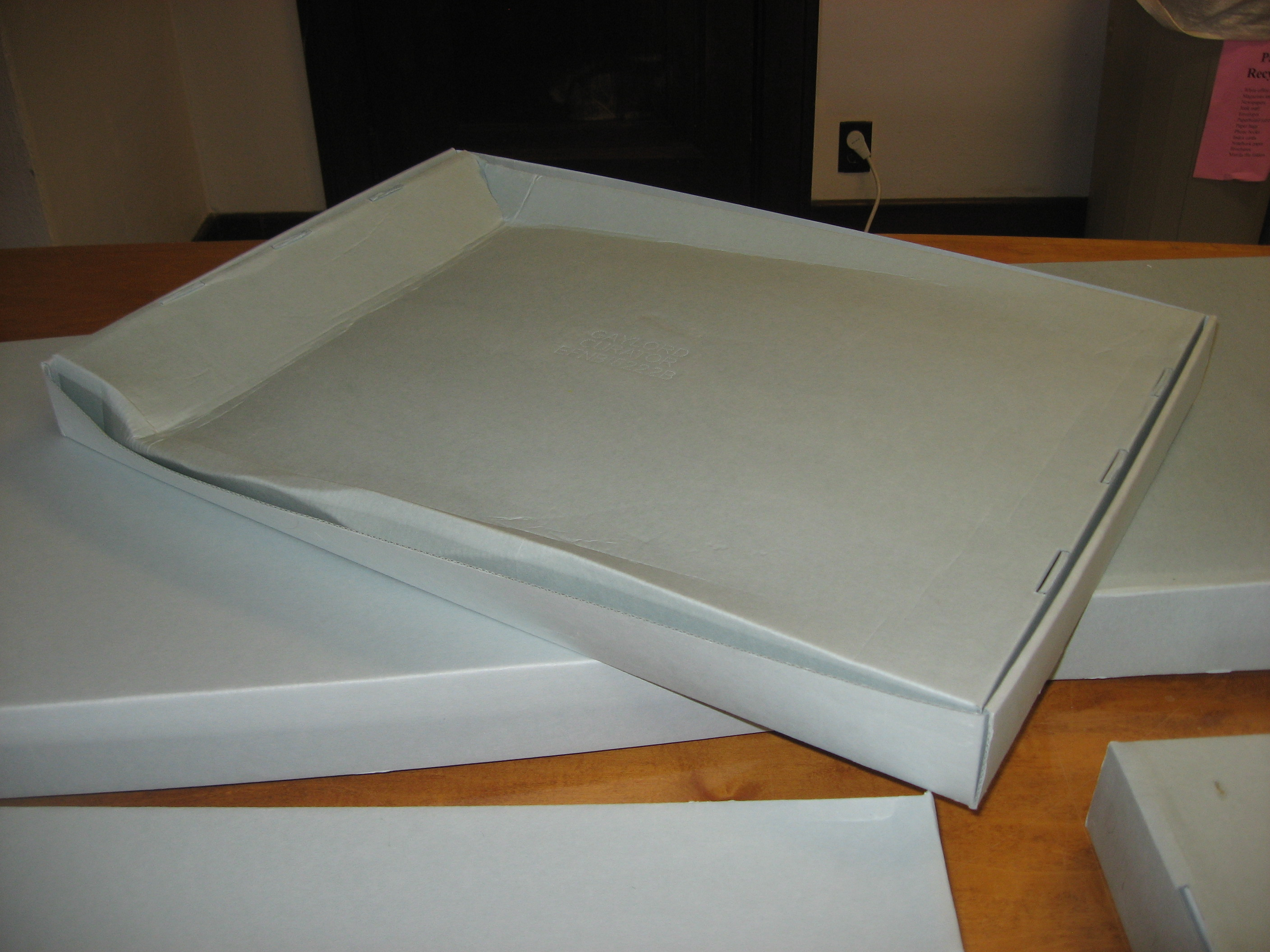
Creep on the underside of a cardboard box due to applied stress

Focusing his researches on the engineering mechanical properties of materials, Chokshi has worked on ceramic materials which has assisted in a wider understanding of how the material behaves in high temperature and the role of interfaces in the process. He is known to be one of the pioneers of research on the mechanical behavior of nanomaterials and his work elucidated the deformation mechanisms leading to superplasticity. His work covered cavitation failure, superimposition of hydrostatic pressure and creep of materials such as alumina, ceramics, ceramic composites and magnesium alloys. He has documented his researches in over 135 articles and the online article repository of the Indian Academy of Sciences has listed 115 of them. (Note: Please see Articles section)

Chokshi was one of the scientists who reported the strengthening in nanometals and contributed to the establishment of a creep and tensile testing laboratory for examining superplasticity in ceramics at the University of California, San Diego. He was also instrumental in setting up a similar laboratory at the Indian Institute of Science with facilities for electro sinter forging for ceramics and electrophoretic deposition for nanocrystalline metals. He served as a member of the International Advisory Boards of the 1997, 2000 and 2003 editions of the International Conference on Superplasticity in Advanced Materials (ICSAM) and has also served as a visiting faculty at a number of universities in the US, Europe and Japan.

== Awards and honors ==
Chokshi received the Swarnajayanti Young Scientist Award from the President of India in 1998 and two years later, the Materials Research Society of India awarded him the MRSI Medal for the year 2000. The year 2001 brought him two honors, the Metallurgist of the Year Award of the Indian Institute of Metals as well as the elected fellowship of the National Academy of Sciences, India. The Council of Scientific and Industrial Research awarded him the Shanti Swarup Bhatnagar Prize, one of the highest Indian science awards in 2003. In 2004, he received the Citation Laureate Award of Thomson Scientific and was elected as a fellow by the Indian National Academy of Engineering and the Indian National Science Academy; he became a fellow of the Indian Academy of Sciences, the next year. The Indian Institute of Metals honored him again in 2006 with the G. D. Birla Award and his alma mater, the Indian Institute of Technology, Madras selected him for the Distinguished Alumnus Award in 2008. Choshi, a life member of the Materials Research Society of India, has been listed among the 100 material scientists with the highest number of citations.

== Selected bibliography ==
- Prasad, M. J. N. V.; Chokshi, A. H. (2011). "On the exothermic peak during annealing of electrodeposited nanocrystalline nickel". Scripta Materialia. 64 (6): 544–547. doi:10.1016/j.scriptamat.2010.11.038.
- Kini, Maya; Chokshi, Atul H. (2010). "The influence of titania on creep in superplastic zirconia". Journal of the American Ceramic Society. 93 (6): 1725–1731. doi:10.1111/j.1551-2916.2010.03617.x.
- Chokshi, Atul Harish (2009). "Unusual stress and grain size dependence for creep in nanocrystalline materials". Scripta Materialia. 61 (1): 96–99. doi:10.1016/j.scriptamat.2009.03.009.
- Chokshi, Atul Harish (2008). "Triple junction limited grain growth in nanomaterials". Scripta Materialia. 59 (7): 726–729. doi:10.1016/j.scriptamat.2008.06.009.
- Kottada, R. S.; Chokshi, A. H. (2007). "Grain boundary sliding during diffusion and dislocation creep in a Mg-0.7 Pct Al alloy". Metallurgical and Materials Transactions A. 38 (8): 1743–1749. Bibcode:2007MMTA...38.1743K. doi:10.1007/s11661-007-9190-x. S2CID 135523198.
- Chokshi, Atul Harish (2005). "Cavity nucleation and growth in superplasticity". Materials Science and Engineering: A. 410–411: 95–99. doi:10.1016/j.msea.2005.08.069.
- Satapathy, L. N.; Chokshi, Atul H. (2004). "Effect of spinel second phase on high temperature deformation in alumina". Materials Science Forum. 447–448: 341–346. doi:10.4028/www.scientific.net/MSF.447-448.341. S2CID 137398972.

== See also ==
- Nanoceramic
