= Liquid phase sintering =

Liquid phase sintering is a sintering technique that uses a liquid phase to accelerate the interparticle bonding of the solid phase. In addition to rapid initial particle rearrangement due to capillary forces, mass transport through liquid is generally orders of magnitude faster than through solid, enhancing the diffusional mechanisms that drive densification. The liquid phase can be obtained either through mixing different powders—melting one component or forming a eutectic—or by sintering at a temperature between the liquidus and solidus. Additionally, since the softer phase is generally the first to melt, the resulting microstructure typically consists of hard particles in a ductile matrix, increasing the toughness of an otherwise brittle component. However, liquid phase sintering is inherently less predictable than solid phase sintering due to the complexity added by the presence of additional phases and rapid solidification rates. Activated sintering is the solid-state analog to the process of liquid phase sintering.

== Process ==
Historically, liquid phase sintering was used to process ceramic materials like clay bricks, earthenware, and porcelain. Modern liquid phase sintering was first applied in the 1930s to materials like cemented carbides (e.g. WC-Co) for cutting tools, porous brass (Cu-Sn) for oil-less bearings, and tungsten-heavy alloys (W-Ni-Cu), but now finds applications ranging from superalloys to dental ceramics to capacitors. Liquid phase sintering occurs in three overlapping stages.

=== Rearrangement ===
Two powders, a base and an additive, are mixed and pressed into a green compact. The green compact is then heated to a temperature where a liquid forms; volume fractions between 5-15% liquid are typical. The capillary force due to the wetting of the solid particles by the liquid rapidly pulls the liquid into interparticle voids and causes particles to rearrange. Wettability is described by the contact angle, $\theta$, which can be given as a difference of relative surface energies between the solid, liquid, and vapor ($S$, $L$, $V$, respectively):

$\theta = \arccos \left( \frac{\gamma_{SV}}{\gamma_{LV}} - \frac{\gamma_{SL}}{\gamma_{LV}} \right)$

Low contact angles indicate good wettability, and will result in a capillary force pulling the compact together. High contact angles indicate poor wettability, which will result in compact swelling. Wettability can be improved by alloying or by increasing temperature, and is also aided by small, regularly shaped particles and a homogeneous green compact. An extremely effective approach is to directly coat powders with the liquid-forming component, allowing the liquid phase to form directly on the particle boundaries. However, components can experience “slumping”, or shape distortion, if too much liquid is formed during this stage. The rearrangement stage proceeds very rapidly, with the majority of densification occurring within three minutes of melt formation.

=== Solution-Reprecipitation ===
As porosity is eliminated and rearrangement slows, diffusive mechanisms, analogous to those present in diffusional creep, become dominant and change the sizes and shapes of powder particles. These mechanisms proceed via the dissolution of solid into the liquid phase, diffusion through the liquid, and reprecipitation; hence, the solubility and diffusivity of the solid in the liquid controls the rates of these processes. The process of grain growth or particle coarsening is called Ostwald ripening and occurs because smaller grains are more soluble in the liquid than larger grains. The resulting concentration gradient causes material to diffuse through the liquid, causing larger grains to grow at the expense of smaller grains. Shape change proceeds similarly; in a process termed “contact flattening”, solid preferentially dissolves in areas with high capillary pressure (i.e. where particles are close together) and reprecipitates elsewhere. Thus, two curved surfaces in close proximity will flatten over time. Shape change can also be driven by anisotropy in the surface energy of the solid and/or differences in the magnitudes of the solid-solid and solid-liquid interfacial energies. These shape changes allow the grains to pack more tightly, further eliminating porosity and densifying the compact. Early models of solution-reprecipitation demonstrate that the rate of densification can be increased by increasing temperature, decreasing the grain size, and increasing the solid solubility in the liquid.

=== Final Densification ===
In the final stage, densification is slowed even further because the compact strengthens with neck growth and the formation of a solid skeletal microstructure. This regime is typically best described by classical solid phase sintering. Rearrangement is inhibited, but coarsening continues to occur via diffusion. Additionally, pores containing trapped gas can expand until the pore pressure, $P_{pore}$, is balanced against the liquid-vapor surface energy. For spherical pores with diameter $d_{pore}$, this is described by

$P_{pore}=\frac{4\gamma_{LV}}{d_{pore}}$

where $\gamma_{LV}$ is the liquid/vapor interfacial energy. Generally, due to coarsening and pore expansion, extensive time in this final stage tends to degrade the properties of compacts.

== Properties ==
Generally, the liquid phase will solidify into a continuous ductile matrix that encapsulates the harder, brittle particles. Mechanical properties are typically the primary concern of sintered components, which is a composite with the hard phase providing strength and the matrix providing toughness. The mechanical properties are largely dictated by the residual porosity, but in fully dense components, the dominant factor is the microstructure that forms as a result of sintering. As a first approximation, many mechanical properties, such as hardness and elastic modulus, can be linked to the volume fraction of each phase, with the rule of mixtures giving an upper bound and the inverse rule of mixtures giving a lower bound. High-temperature mechanical properties are typically controlled by the creep behavior of the matrix, due to its lower melting point. Thus, property optimization can be difficult, as reducing the volume fraction of matrix improves creep behavior, but may negatively impact the sintering behavior. For high-temperature materials, a variation of the process termed "transient liquid phase sintering" is typically used, in which the liquid is highly soluble in the solid phase and disappears over time.

== See also ==
- Sintering
