= Sintering =

Process of forming and bonding material by heat or pressure

Heat and compaction fuse small particles into a dense bulk

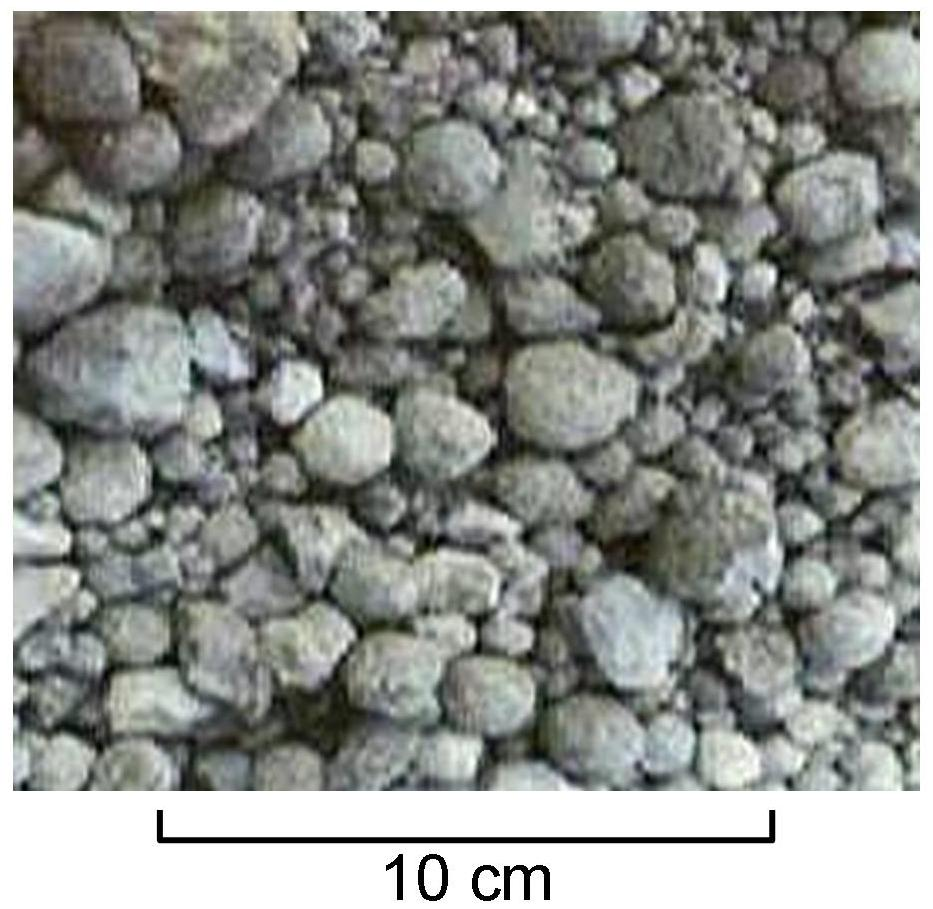
Clinker nodules produced by sintering

Sintering or frittage is the process of compacting and forming a solid mass of material by pressure or heat without melting it to the point of liquefaction. Sintering happens as part of a manufacturing process used with metals, ceramics, plastics, and other materials. The atoms/molecules in the sintered material diffuse across the boundaries of the particles, fusing the particles together and creating a solid piece.

Since the sintering temperature does not have to reach the melting point of the material, sintering is often chosen as the shaping process for materials with extremely high melting points, such as tungsten and molybdenum. The study of sintering in metallurgical powder-related processes is known as powder metallurgy.

An example of sintering can be observed when ice cubes in a glass of water adhere to each other, which is driven by the temperature difference between the water and the ice. Examples of pressure-driven sintering are the compacting of snowfall to a glacier, and the formation of a hard snowball by pressing loose snow together.

The material produced by sintering is called sinter. The word sinter comes from the Middle High German sinter, a cognate of English cinder.

== General sintering ==
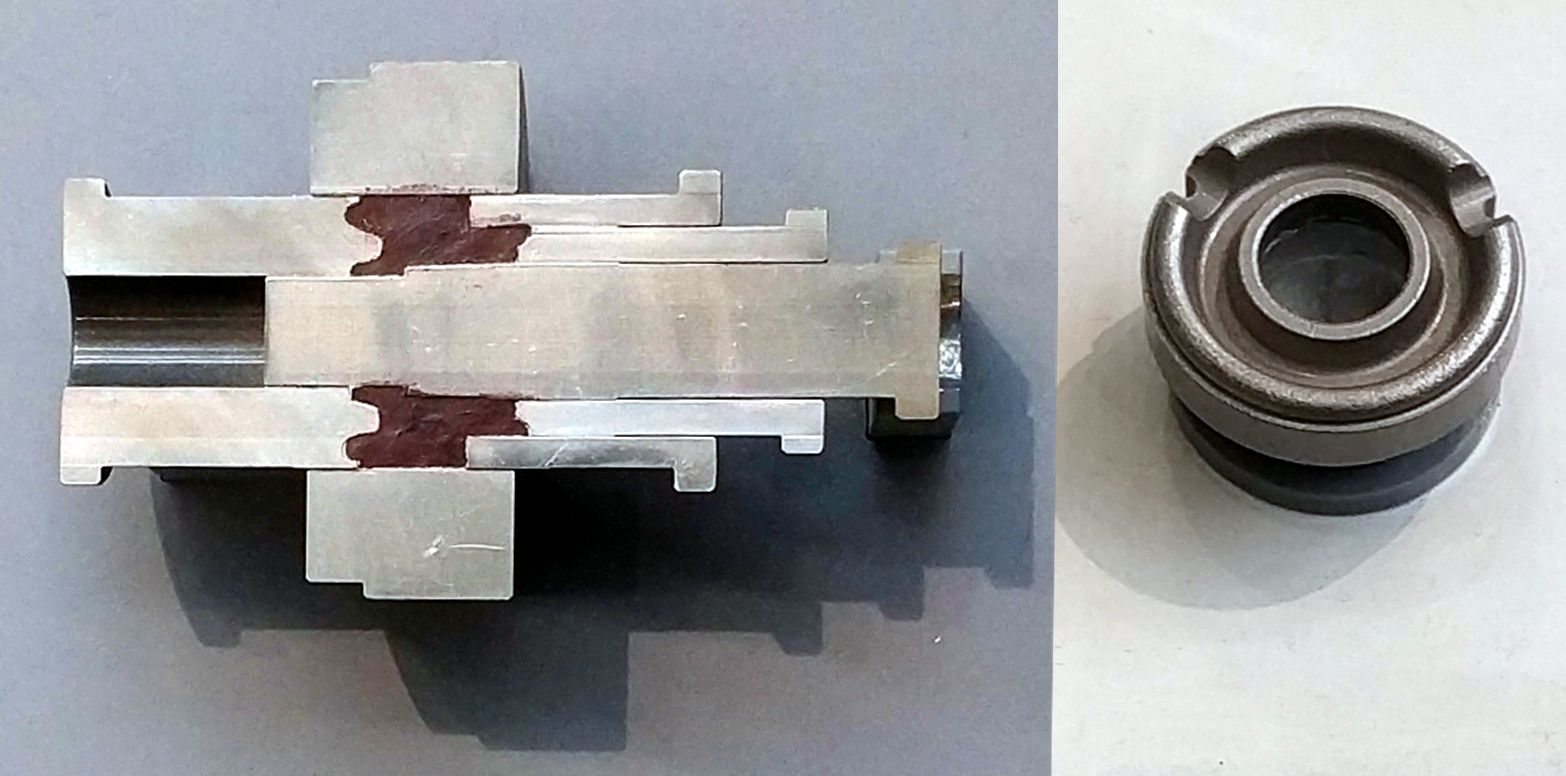
Cross section of a sintering tool and the sintered part

In manufacturing, sintering is generally considered successful when the process reduces porosity and enhances properties such as strength, electrical conductivity, translucency and thermal conductivity. In some special cases, sintering is carefully applied to enhance the strength of a material while preserving porosity (like in filters or catalysts, where gas adsorption is a priority). During the sintering process, atomic diffusion drives powder surface elimination in different stages, starting at the formation of necks between powders to final elimination of small pores at the end of the process.

The driving force for densification is the change in free energy from the decrease in surface area and lowering of the surface free energy by the replacement of solid-vapor interfaces. It forms new but lower-energy solid-solid interfaces with a net decrease in total free energy. On a microscopic scale, material transfer is affected by the change in pressure and differences in free energy across the curved surface. If the size of the particle is small (and its curvature is high), these effects become very large in magnitude. The change in energy is much higher when the radius of curvature is less than a few micrometers, which is one of the main reasons why much ceramic technology is based on the use of fine-particle materials.

The ratio of bond area to particle size is a determining factor for properties such as strength and electrical conductivity. To yield the desired bond area, temperature and initial grain size are precisely controlled over the sintering process. At steady state, the particle radius and the vapor pressure are proportional to (p_{0})^{2/3} and to (p_{0})^{1/3}, respectively.

The source of power for solid-state processes is the change in free or chemical potential energy between the neck and the surface of the particle. This energy creates a transfer of material through the fastest means possible; if transfer were to take place from the particle volume or the grain boundary between particles, particle count would decrease and pores would be destroyed. Pore elimination is fastest in samples with many pores of uniform size because the boundary diffusion distance is smallest. During the latter portions of the process, boundary and lattice diffusion from the boundary become important.

Control of temperature is very important to the sintering process, since grain-boundary diffusion and volume diffusion rely heavily upon temperature, particle size, particle distribution, material composition, and often other properties of the sintering environment itself.

== Ceramic sintering ==
Sintering is part of the firing process used in the manufacture of pottery and other ceramic objects. Sintering and vitrification (which requires higher temperatures) are the two main mechanisms behind the strength and stability of ceramics. Sintered ceramic objects are made from substances such as glass, alumina, zirconia, silica, magnesia, lime, beryllium oxide, and ferric oxide. Some ceramic raw materials have a lower affinity for water and a lower plasticity index than clay, requiring organic additives in the stages before sintering.

Sintering begins when sufficient temperatures have been reached to mobilize the active elements in the ceramic material, which can start below their melting point (typically at 50–80% of their melting point), e.g. as premelting. When sufficient sintering has taken place, the ceramic body will no longer break down in water; additional sintering can reduce the porosity of the ceramic, increase the bond area between ceramic particles, and increase the material strength.

Industrial procedures to create ceramic objects via sintering of powders generally include:

- mixing water, binder, deflocculant, and unfired ceramic powder to form a slurry
- spray-drying the slurry
- putting the spray dried powder into a mold and pressing it to form a green body (an unsintered ceramic item)
- heating the green body at low temperature to burn off the binder
- sintering at a high temperature to fuse the ceramic particles together.

All the characteristic temperatures associated with phase transformation, glass transitions, and melting points, occurring during a sinterisation cycle of a particular ceramic's formulation (i.e., tails and frits) can be easily obtained by observing the expansion-temperature curves during optical dilatometer thermal analysis. In fact, sinterisation is associated with a remarkable shrinkage of the material because glass phases flow once their transition temperature is reached, and start consolidating the powdery structure and considerably reducing the porosity of the material.

Sintering is performed at high temperature. Additionally, a second and/or third external force (such as pressure, electric current) could be used. A commonly used second external force is pressure. Sintering performed by only heating is generally termed "pressureless sintering", which is possible with graded metal-ceramic composites, utilising a nanoparticle sintering aid and bulk molding technology. A variant used for 3D shapes is called hot isostatic pressing.

To allow efficient stacking of product in the furnace during sintering and to prevent parts sticking together, many manufacturers separate ware using ceramic powder separator sheets. These sheets are available in various materials such as alumina, zirconia and magnesia. They are additionally categorized by fine, medium and coarse particle sizes. By matching the material and particle size to the ware being sintered, surface damage and contamination can be reduced while maximizing furnace loading.

== Sintering of metallic powders ==
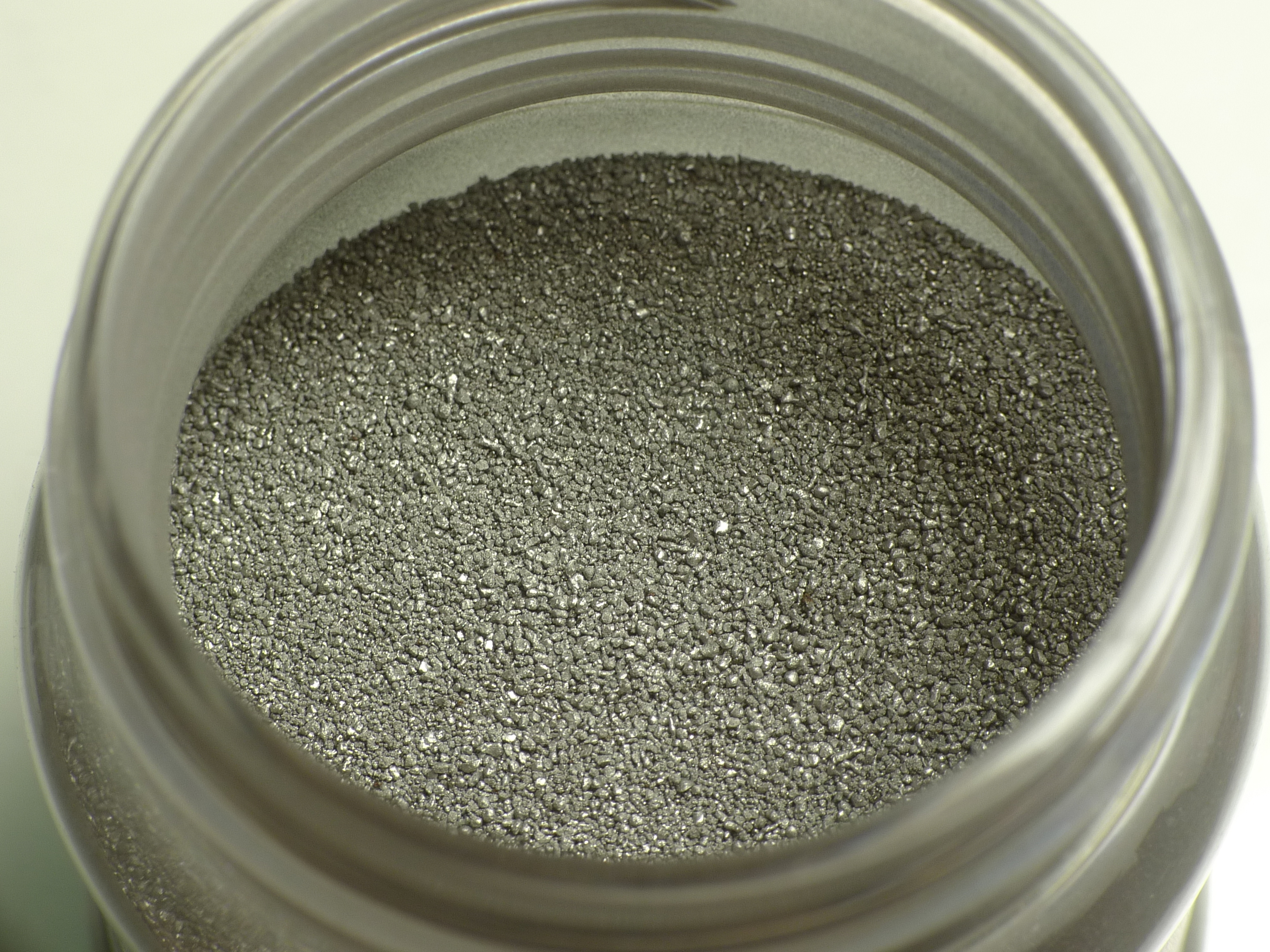
Iron powder

Most metals can be sintered, although some with greater difficulty (i.e., aluminium alloy and titanium alloys). This applies especially to pure metals produced in vacuum which suffer no surface contamination. Sintering under atmospheric pressure requires the use of a protective gas, quite often endothermic gas. Sintering, with subsequent reworking, can produce a great range of material properties. Changes in density, alloying, and heat treatments can alter the physical characteristics of various products. For instance, the Young's modulus E_{n} of sintered iron powders remains somewhat insensitive to sintering time, alloying, or particle size in the original powder for lower sintering temperatures, but depends upon the density of the final product:

$$E_n/E = (D/d)^{3.4}$$
where D is the density, E is Young's modulus and d is the maximum density of iron.

Sintering is static when a metal powder under certain external conditions may exhibit coalescence, and yet reverts to its normal behavior when such conditions are removed. In most cases, the density of a collection of grains increases as material flows into voids, causing a decrease in overall volume. Mass movements that occur during sintering consist of the reduction of total porosity by repacking, followed by material transport due to evaporation and condensation from diffusion. In the final stages, metal atoms move along crystal boundaries to the walls of internal pores, redistributing mass from the internal bulk of the object and smoothing pore walls. Surface tension is the driving force for this movement.

A special form of sintering (which is still considered part of powder metallurgy) is liquid-state sintering in which at least one but not all elements are in a liquid state. Liquid-state sintering is required for making cemented carbide and tungsten carbide.

Sintered bronze in particular is frequently used as a material for bearings, since its porosity allows lubricants to flow through it or remain captured within it. Sintered copper may be used as a wicking structure in certain types of heat pipe construction, where the porosity allows a liquid agent to move through the porous material via capillary action. For materials that have high melting points such as molybdenum, tungsten, rhenium, tantalum, osmium and carbon, sintering is one of the few viable manufacturing processes. In these cases, very low porosity is desirable and can often be achieved.

Sintered metal powder is used to make frangible shotgun shells called breaching rounds, as used by military and SWAT teams to quickly force entry into a locked room. These shotgun shells are designed to destroy door deadbolts, locks and hinges without risking lives by ricocheting or by flying on at lethal speed through the door. They work by destroying the object they hit and then dispersing into a relatively harmless powder.

Sintered bronze and stainless steel are used as filter materials in applications requiring high temperature resistance while retaining the ability to regenerate the filter element. For example, sintered stainless steel elements are employed for filtering steam in food and pharmaceutical applications, and sintered bronze in aircraft hydraulic systems.

Sintering of powders containing precious metals such as silver and gold is used to make small jewelry items. Evaporative self-assembly of colloidal silver nanocubes into supercrystals has been shown to allow the sintering of electrical joints at temperatures lower than 200 °C.

=== Advantages ===
Particular advantages of the powder technology include:

1. Very high levels of purity and uniformity in starting materials
2. Preservation of purity, due to the simpler subsequent fabrication process (fewer steps) that it makes possible
3. Stabilization of the details of repetitive operations, by control of grain size during the input stages
4. Absence of binding contact between segregated powder particles – or "inclusions" (called stringering) – as often occurs in melting processes
5. No deformation needed to produce directional elongation of grains
6. Capability to produce materials of controlled, uniform porosity.
7. Capability to produce nearly net-shaped objects.
8. Capability to produce materials which cannot be produced by any other technology.
9. Capability to fabricate high-strength material like turbine blades.
10. After sintering the mechanical strength to handling becomes higher.

The literature contains many references on sintering dissimilar materials to produce solid/solid-phase compounds or solid/melt mixtures at the processing stage. Almost any substance can be obtained in powder form, through either chemical, mechanical or physical processes, so basically any material can be obtained through sintering. When pure elements are sintered, the leftover powder is still pure, so it can be recycled.

== Plastics sintering ==
Plastic materials are formed by sintering for applications that require materials of specific porosity. Sintered plastic porous components are used in filtration and to control fluid and gas flows. Sintered plastics are used in applications requiring caustic fluid separation processes such as the nibs in whiteboard markers, inhaler filters, and vents for caps and liners on packaging materials. Sintered ultra high molecular weight polyethylene materials are used as ski and snowboard base materials. The porous texture allows wax to be retained within the structure of the base material, thus providing a more durable wax coating.

== Liquid phase sintering ==
For materials that are difficult to sinter, a process called liquid phase sintering is commonly used. Materials for which liquid phase sintering is common are Si_{3}N_{4}, WC, SiC, and more. Liquid phase sintering is the process of adding an additive to the powder which will melt before the matrix phase. The process of liquid phase sintering has three stages:

- rearrangement – As the liquid melts capillary action will pull the liquid into pores and also cause grains to rearrange into a more favorable packing arrangement.
- solution-precipitation – In areas where capillary pressures are high (particles are close together) atoms will preferentially go into solution and then precipitate in areas of lower chemical potential where particles are not close or in contact. This is called contact flattening. This densifies the system in a way similar to grain boundary diffusion in solid state sintering. Ostwald ripening will also occur where smaller particles will go into solution preferentially and precipitate on larger particles leading to densification.
- final densification – densification of solid skeletal network, liquid movement from efficiently packed regions into pores.

For liquid phase sintering to be practical the major phase should be at least slightly soluble in the liquid phase and the additive should melt before any major sintering of the solid particulate network occurs, otherwise rearrangement of grains will not occur. Liquid phase sintering was successfully applied to improve grain growth of thin semiconductor layers from nanoparticle precursor films.

== Electric current assisted sintering ==
These techniques employ electric currents to drive or enhance sintering. English engineer A. G. Bloxam registered in 1906 the first patent on sintering powders using direct current in vacuum. The primary purpose of his inventions was the industrial scale production of filaments for incandescent lamps by compacting tungsten or molybdenum particles. The applied current was particularly effective in reducing surface oxides that increased the emissivity of the filaments.

In 1913, Weintraub and Rush patented a modified sintering method which combined electric current with pressure. The benefits of this method were proved for the sintering of refractory metals as well as conductive carbide or nitride powders. The starting boron–carbon or silicon–carbon powders were placed in an electrically insulating tube and compressed by two rods which also served as electrodes for the current. The estimated sintering temperature was 2000 °C.

In the United States, sintering was first patented by Duval d'Adrian in 1922. His three-step process aimed at producing heat-resistant blocks from such oxide materials as zirconia, thoria or tantalia. The steps were: (i) molding the powder; (ii) annealing it at about 2500 °C to make it conducting; (iii) applying current-pressure sintering as in the method by Weintraub and Rush.

Sintering that uses an arc produced via a capacitance discharge to eliminate oxides before direct current heating, was patented by G. F. Taylor in 1932. This originated sintering methods employing pulsed or alternating current, eventually superimposed to a direct current. Those techniques have been developed over many decades and summarized in more than 640 patents.

Of these technologies the most well known is resistance sintering (also called hot pressing) and spark plasma sintering, while electro sinter forging is the latest advancement in this field.

=== Spark plasma sintering ===
In spark plasma sintering (SPS), external pressure and an electric field are applied simultaneously to enhance the densification of the metallic/ceramic powder compacts. However, after commercialization it was determined there is no plasma, so the proper name is spark sintering as coined by Lenel. The electric field driven densification supplements sintering with a form of hot pressing, to enable lower temperatures and taking less time than typical sintering. For a number of years, it was speculated that the existence of sparks or plasma between particles could aid sintering; however, Hulbert and coworkers systematically proved that the electric parameters used during spark plasma sintering make it (highly) unlikely. In light of this, the name "spark plasma sintering" has been rendered obsolete. Terms such as field assisted sintering technique (FAST), electric field assisted sintering (EFAS), and direct current sintering (DCS) have been implemented by the sintering community. Using a direct current (DC) pulse as the electric current, spark plasma, spark impact pressure, joule heating, and an electrical field diffusion effect would be created. By modifying the graphite die design and its assembly, it is possible to perform pressureless sintering in spark plasma sintering facility. This modified die design setup is reported to synergize the advantages of both conventional pressureless sintering and spark plasma sintering techniques.

=== Electro sinter forging ===
Electro sinter forging is an electric current assisted sintering (ECAS) technology originated from capacitor discharge sintering. It is used for the production of diamond metal matrix composites and is under evaluation for the production of hard metals, nitinol and other metals and intermetallics. It is characterized by a very low sintering time, allowing machines to sinter at the same speed as a compaction press.

== Pressureless sintering ==
Pressureless sintering is the sintering of a powder compact (sometimes at very high temperatures, depending on the powder) without applied pressure. This avoids density variations in the final component, which occurs with more traditional hot pressing methods.

The powder compact (if a ceramic) can be created by slip casting, injection moulding, and cold isostatic pressing. After presintering, the final green compact can be machined to its final shape before being sintered.

Three different heating schedules can be performed with pressureless sintering: constant-rate of heating (CRH), rate-controlled sintering (RCS), and two-step sintering (TSS). The microstructure and grain size of the ceramics may vary depending on the material and method used.

Constant-rate of heating (CRH), also known as temperature-controlled sintering, consists of heating the green compact at a constant rate up to the sintering temperature. Experiments with zirconia have been performed to optimize the sintering temperature and sintering rate for CRH method. Results showed that the grain sizes were identical when the samples were sintered to the same density, proving that grain size is a function of specimen density rather than CRH temperature mode.

In rate-controlled sintering (RCS), the densification rate in the open-porosity phase is lower than in the CRH method. By definition, the relative density, ρ_{rel}, in the open-porosity phase is lower than 90%. Although this should prevent separation of pores from grain boundaries, it has been proven statistically that RCS did not produce smaller grain sizes than CRH for alumina, zirconia, and ceria samples.

Two-step sintering (TSS) uses two different sintering temperatures. The first sintering temperature should guarantee a relative density higher than 75% of theoretical sample density. This will remove supercritical pores from the body. The sample will then be cooled down and held at the second sintering temperature until densification is completed. Grains of cubic zirconia and cubic strontium titanate were significantly refined by TSS compared to CRH. However, the grain size changes in other ceramic materials, like tetragonal zirconia and hexagonal alumina, were not statistically significant.

== Microwave sintering ==
In microwave sintering, heat is sometimes generated internally within the material, rather than via surface radiative heat transfer from an external heat source. Some materials fail to couple and others exhibit run-away behavior, so it is restricted in usefulness. A benefit of microwave sintering is faster heating for small loads, meaning less time is needed to reach the sintering temperature, less heating energy is required and there are improvements in the product properties.

A failing of microwave sintering is that it generally sinters only one compact at a time, so overall productivity turns out to be poor except for situations involving one of a kind sintering, such as for artists. As microwaves can only penetrate a short distance in materials with a high conductivity and a high permeability, microwave sintering requires the sample to be delivered in powders with a particle size around the penetration depth of microwaves in the particular material. The sintering process and side-reactions run several times faster during microwave sintering at the same temperature, which results in different properties for the sintered product.

This technique is acknowledged to be quite effective in maintaining fine grains/nano sized grains in sintered bioceramics. Magnesium phosphates and calcium phosphates are the examples which have been processed through the microwave sintering technique.

== Densification, vitrification and grain growth ==
Sintering in practice is the control of both densification and grain growth. Densification is the act of reducing porosity in a sample, thereby making it denser. Grain growth is the process of grain boundary motion and Ostwald ripening to increase the average grain size. Many properties (mechanical strength, electrical breakdown strength, etc.) benefit from both a high relative density and a small grain size. Therefore, being able to control these properties during processing is of high technical importance. Since densification of powders requires high temperatures, grain growth naturally occurs during sintering. Reduction of this process is key for many engineering ceramics. Under certain conditions of chemistry and orientation, some grains may grow rapidly at the expense of their neighbours during sintering. This phenomenon, known as abnormal grain growth (AGG), results in a bimodal grain size distribution that has consequences for the mechanical, dielectric and thermal performance of the sintered material.

For densification to occur at a quick pace it is essential to have (1) an amount of liquid phase that is large in size, (2) a near complete solubility of the solid in the liquid, and (3) wetting of the solid by the liquid. The power behind the densification is derived from the capillary pressure of the liquid phase located between the fine solid particles. When the liquid phase wets the solid particles, each space between the particles becomes a capillary in which a substantial capillary pressure is developed. For submicrometre particle sizes, capillaries with diameters in the range of 0.1 to 1 micrometres develop pressures in the range of 175 pounds per square inch (1,210 kPa) to 1,750 pounds per square inch (12,100 kPa) for silicate liquids and in the range of 975 pounds per square inch (6,720 kPa) to 9,750 pounds per square inch (67,200 kPa) for a metal such as liquid cobalt.

Densification requires constant capillary pressure where just solution-precipitation material transfer would not produce densification. For further densification, additional particle movement while the particle undergoes grain-growth and grain-shape changes occurs. Shrinkage would result when the liquid slips between particles and increases pressure at points of contact causing the material to move away from the contact areas, forcing particle centers to draw near each other.

The sintering of liquid-phase materials involves a fine-grained solid phase to create the needed capillary pressures proportional to its diameter, and the liquid concentration must also create the required capillary pressure within range, else the process ceases. The vitrification rate is dependent upon the pore size, the viscosity and amount of liquid phase present leading to the viscosity of the overall composition, and the surface tension. Temperature dependence for densification controls the process because at higher temperatures viscosity decreases and increases liquid content. Therefore, when changes to the composition and processing are made, it will affect the vitrification process.

=== Sintering mechanisms ===
Sintering occurs by diffusion of atoms through the microstructure. This diffusion is caused by a gradient of chemical potential – atoms move from an area of higher chemical potential to an area of lower chemical potential. The different paths the atoms take to get from one spot to another are the "sintering mechanisms" or "matter transport mechanisms".

In solid state sintering, the six common mechanisms are:

1. surface diffusion – diffusion of atoms along the surface of a particle
2. vapor transport – evaporation of atoms which condense on a different surface
3. lattice diffusion from surface – atoms from surface diffuse through lattice
4. lattice diffusion from grain boundary – atom from grain boundary diffuses through lattice
5. grain boundary diffusion – atoms diffuse along grain boundary
6. plastic deformation – dislocation motion causes flow of matter.

Mechanisms 1–3 above are non-densifying (i.e. do not cause the pores and the overall ceramic body to shrink) but can still increase the area of the bond or "neck" between grains; they take atoms from the surface and rearrange them onto another surface or part of the same surface. Mechanisms 4–6 are densifying – atoms are moved from the bulk material or the grain boundaries to the surface of pores, thereby eliminating porosity and increasing the density of the sample.

=== Grain growth ===
A grain boundary (GB) is the transition area or interface between adjacent crystallites (or grains) of the same chemical and lattice composition, not to be confused with a phase boundary. The adjacent grains do not have the same orientation of the lattice, thus giving the atoms in GB shifted positions relative to the lattice in the crystals. Due to the shifted positioning of the atoms in the GB they have a higher energy state when compared with the atoms in the crystal lattice of the grains. It is this imperfection that makes it possible to selectively etch the GBs when one wants the microstructure to be visible.

Striving to minimize its energy leads to the coarsening of the microstructure to reach a metastable state within the specimen. This involves minimizing its GB area and changing its topological structure to minimize its energy. This grain growth can either be normal or abnormal, a normal grain growth is characterized by the uniform growth and size of all the grains in the specimen. Abnormal grain growth is when a few grains grow much larger than the remaining majority.

==== Grain boundary energy/tension ====
The atoms in the GB are normally in a higher energy state than their equivalent in the bulk material. This is due to their more stretched bonds, which gives rise to a GB tension $\sigma_{GB}$. This extra energy that the atoms possess is called the grain boundary energy, $\gamma_{GB}$. The grain will want to minimize this extra energy, thus striving to make the grain boundary area smaller and this change requires energy.

"Or, in other words, a force has to be applied, in the plane of the grain boundary and acting along a line in the grain-boundary area, in order to extend the grain-boundary area in the direction of the force. The force per unit length, i.e. tension/stress, along the line mentioned is σGB. On the basis of this reasoning it would follow that:

$$\sigma_{GB} dA \text{ (work done)} = \gamma_{GB} dA \text{ (energy change)}\,\!$$

with dA as the increase of grain-boundary area per unit length along the line in the grain-boundary area considered."^{[pg 478]}

The GB tension can also be thought of as the attractive forces between the atoms at the surface and the tension between these atoms is due to the fact that there is a larger interatomic distance between them at the surface compared to the bulk (i.e. surface tension). When the surface area becomes bigger the bonds stretch more and the GB tension increases. To counteract this increase in tension there must be a transport of atoms to the surface keeping the GB tension constant. This diffusion of atoms accounts for the constant surface tension in liquids. Then the argument,

$$\sigma_{GB} dA \text{ (work done)} = \gamma_{GB} dA \text{ (energy change)}\,\!$$

holds true. For solids, on the other hand, diffusion of atoms to the surface might not be sufficient and the surface tension can vary with an increase in surface area.

For a solid, one can derive an expression for the change in Gibbs free energy, dG, upon the change of GB area, dA. dG is given by
$$\sigma_{GB} dA \text{ (work done)} = dG \text{ (energy change)} = \gamma_{GB} dA + A d\gamma_{GB}\,\!$$

which gives
$$\sigma_{GB} = \gamma_{GB} + \frac{Ad\gamma_{GB}}{dA}\,\!$$

$\sigma_{GB}$ is normally expressed in units of $\frac{N}{m}$ while $\gamma_{GB}$ is normally expressed in units of $\frac{J}{m^2}$ $(J = Nm)$ since they are different physical properties.

==== Mechanical equilibrium ====
In a two-dimensional isotropic material the grain boundary tension would be the same for the grains. This would give angle of 120° at GB junction where three grains meet. This would give the structure a hexagonal pattern which is the metastable state (or mechanical equilibrium) of the 2D specimen. A consequence of this is that, to keep trying to be as close to the equilibrium as possible, grains with fewer sides than six will bend the GB to try keep the 120° angle between each other. This results in a curved boundary with its curvature towards itself. A grain with six sides will, as mentioned, have straight boundaries, while a grain with more than six sides will have curved boundaries with its curvature away from itself. A grain with six boundaries (i.e. hexagonal structure) is in a metastable state (i.e. local equilibrium) within the 2D structure. In three dimensions structural details are similar but much more complex and the metastable structure for a grain is a non-regular 14-sided polyhedra with doubly curved faces. In practice all arrays of grains are always unstable and thus always grow until prevented by a counterforce.

Grains strive to minimize their energy, and a curved boundary has a higher energy than a straight boundary. This means that the grain boundary will migrate towards the curvature. The consequence of this is that grains with less than 6 sides will decrease in size while grains with more than 6 sides will increase in size.

Grain growth occurs due to motion of atoms across a grain boundary. Convex surfaces have a higher chemical potential than concave surfaces, therefore grain boundaries will move toward their center of curvature. As smaller particles tend to have a higher radius of curvature and this results in smaller grains losing atoms to larger grains and shrinking. This is a process called Ostwald ripening. Large grains grow at the expense of small grains.

Grain growth in a simple model is found to follow:
$$G^m= G_0^m+Kt$$

Here G is final average grain size, G_{0} is the initial average grain size, t is time, m is a factor between 2 and 4, and K is a factor given by:
$$K= K_0 e^{\frac{-Q}{RT}}$$

Here Q is the molar activation energy, R is the ideal gas constant, T is absolute temperature, and K_{0} is a material dependent factor. In most materials the sintered grain size is proportional to the inverse square root of the fractional porosity, implying that pores are the most effective retardant for grain growth during sintering.

=== Reducing grain growth ===
==== Solute ions ====
If a dopant is added to the material (example: Nd in BaTiO_{3}) the impurity will tend to stick to the grain boundaries. As the grain boundary tries to move (as atoms jump from the convex to concave surface) the change in concentration of the dopant at the grain boundary will impose a drag on the boundary. The original concentration of solute around the grain boundary will be asymmetrical in most cases. As the grain boundary tries to move, the concentration on the side opposite of motion will have a higher concentration and therefore have a higher chemical potential. This increased chemical potential will act as a backforce to the original chemical potential gradient that is the reason for grain boundary movement. This decrease in net chemical potential will decrease the grain boundary velocity and therefore grain growth.

==== Fine second phase particles ====
If particles of a second phase which are insoluble in the matrix phase are added to the powder in the form of a much finer powder, then this will decrease grain boundary movement. When the grain boundary tries to move past the inclusion diffusion of atoms from one grain to the other, it will be hindered by the insoluble particle. This is because it is beneficial for particles to reside in the grain boundaries and they exert a force in opposite direction compared to grain boundary migration. This effect is called the Zener effect after the man who estimated this drag force to

$$F = \pi r \lambda \sin (2\theta)\,\!$$
where r is the radius of the particle and λ the interfacial energy of the boundary if there are N particles per unit volume their volume fraction f is
$$f = \frac{4}{3} \pi r^3 N\,\!$$

assuming they are randomly distributed. A boundary of unit area will intersect all particles within a volume of 2r which is 2Nr particles. So the number of particles n intersecting a unit area of grain boundary is:

$$n = \frac{3f}{2 \pi r^2}\,\!$$

Now, assuming that the grains only grow due to the influence of curvature, the driving force of growth is $\frac{2 \lambda}{R}$ where (for homogeneous grain structure) R approximates to the mean diameter of the grains. With this the critical diameter that has to be reached before the grains ceases to grow:

$$n F_{max} = \frac{2 \lambda}{D_{crit}}\,\!$$
This can be reduced to
$$D_{crit} = \frac{4r}{3f} \,\!$$

so the critical diameter of the grains is dependent on the size and volume fraction of the particles at the grain boundaries.

It has also been shown that small bubbles or cavities can act as inclusion

More complicated interactions which slow grain boundary motion include interactions of the surface energies of the two grains and the inclusion and are discussed in detail by C.S. Smith.

== Sintering of catalysts ==
Sintering is an important cause for loss of catalytic activity, especially on supported metal catalysts. It decreases the surface area of the catalyst and changes the surface structure. For a porous catalytic surface, the pores may collapse due to sintering, resulting in loss of surface area. Sintering is in general an irreversible process.

Small catalyst particles have the highest possible relative surface area and high reaction temperature, both factors that generally increase the reactivity of a catalyst. However, these factors are also the circumstances under which sintering occurs. Specific materials may also increase the rate of sintering. On the other hand, by alloying catalysts with other materials, sintering can be reduced. Rare-earth metals in particular have been shown to reduce sintering of metal catalysts when alloyed.

For many supported metal catalysts, sintering starts to become a significant effect at temperatures over 500 °C (932 °F). Catalysts that operate at higher temperatures, such as a car catalyst, use structural improvements to reduce or prevent sintering. These improvements are in general in the form of a support made from an inert and thermally stable material such as silica, carbon or alumina.

== See also ==
- Abnormal grain growth – Phenomenon of certain material grains growing faster than others
- Capacitor discharge sintering – Fast electric current assisted sintering process
- Ceramic engineering – Science and technology of creating objects from inorganic, non-metallic materials
- Direct metal laser sintering – 3D printing technique
- Energetically modified cement – Class of cements, mechanically processed to transform reactivity
- Frit – Fused, quenched and granulated ceramic
- High-temperature superconductivity – Superconductive behavior at temperatures much higher than absolute zero
- Metal clay – Craft material of metal particles and a plastic binder
- Room-temperature densification method – Non-thermal densification method for ceramics
- Selective laser sintering – 3D printing technique, a rapid prototyping technology, that includes Direct Metal Laser Sintering (DMLS).
- Spark plasma sintering – Sintering technique
- W. David Kingery – Ceramic engineer – a pioneer of sintering methods
- Yttria-stabilized zirconia – Ceramic with room temperature stable cubic crystal structure
