= Room-temperature densification method =

Non-thermal densification method for ceramics

The room-temperature densification method was developed for Li_{2}MoO_{4} ceramics and is based on the water-solubility of Li_{2}MoO_{4}. It can be used for the fabrication of Li_{2}MoO_{4} ceramics instead of conventional thermal sintering. The method utilizes a small amount of aqueous phase formed by moistening the Li_{2}MoO_{4} powder. The densification occurs during sample pressing as the solution incorporates the pores between the powder particles and recrystallizes. The contact points of the particles provide a high pressure zone, where solubility is increased, whereas the pores act as a suitable place for the precipitation of the solution. Any residual water is removed by post-processing typically at 120 °C. The method is suitable also for Li_{2}MoO_{4} composite ceramics with up to 30 volume-% of filler material, enabling the optimization of the dielectric properties.
