= Hot isostatic pressing =

Manufacturing process

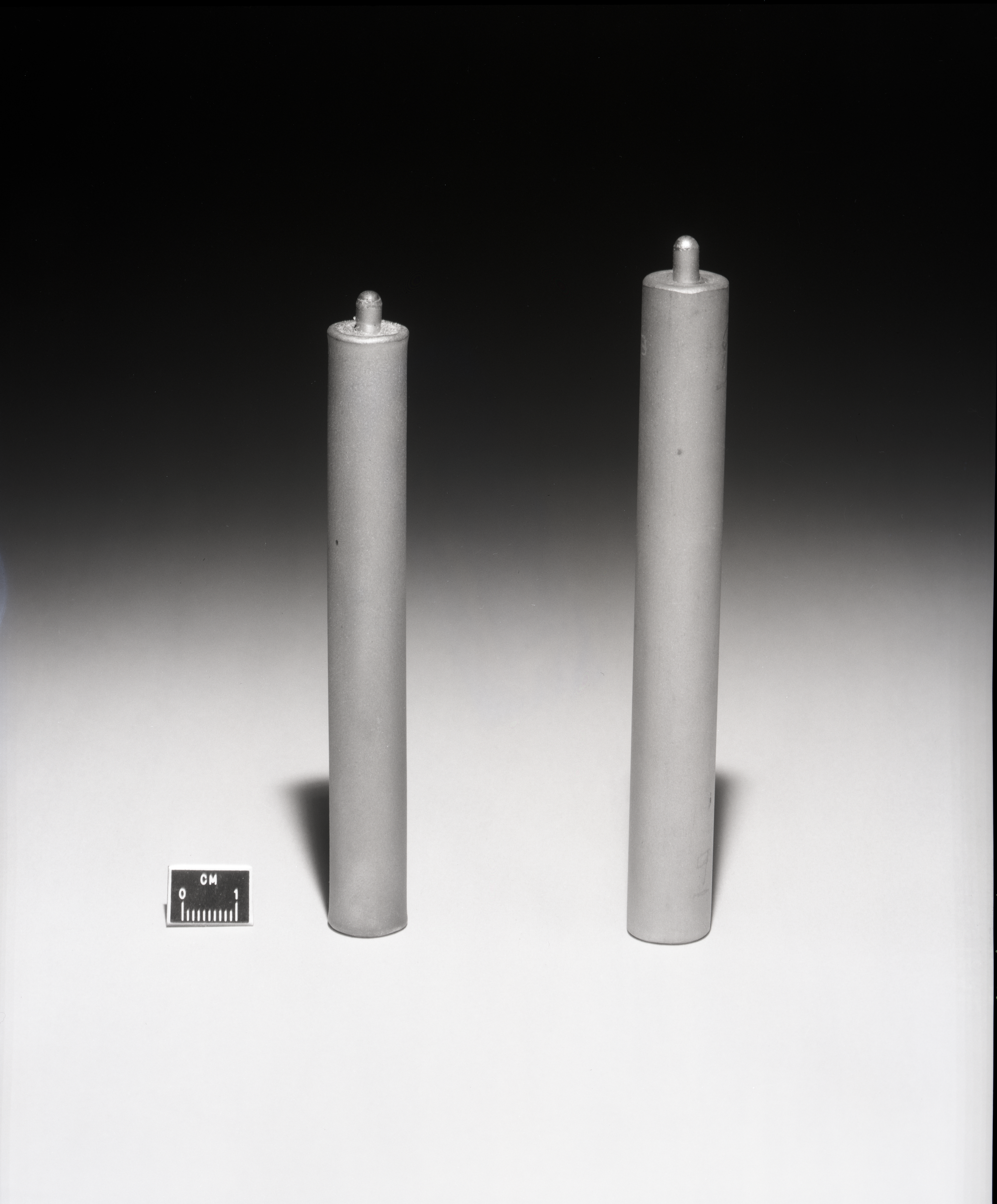
Isostatically pressed nickel alloys

Hot isostatic pressing (HIP) is a manufacturing process used to reduce the porosity of metals and increase the density of many ceramic materials. This improves the materials' mechanical properties and workability. HIP is also used to bond either metal powder or ceramic powder into shapes via powder metallurgy HIP, or PM-HIP.

The HIP process subjects a component to both elevated temperature and isostatic gas pressure within a high-pressure containment vessel, unlike cold isostatic pressing (CIP), where the component is kept at room temperature. The pressurizing gas most widely used is argon. An inert gas is used so that the material does not chemically react. The choice of metal can minimize negative effects of chemical reactions. Nickel, stainless or mild steel, or other metals can be chosen depending on the desired redox conditions. The chamber is heated, causing the pressure inside the vessel to increase. Many systems use associated gas pumping to achieve the necessary pressure level. Pressure is applied to the material from all directions (hence the term "isostatic").

For processing castings, metal powders can also be turned to compact solids by this method, the inert gas is applied at 7,350–45,000 psi (50.7–310.3 MPa), with 15,000 psi (100 MPa) being most common. Process soak temperatures range from 900 °F (482 °C) for aluminium castings to 2,400 °F (1,320 °C) for nickel-based superalloys. When castings are treated with HIP, the simultaneous application of heat and pressure eliminates internal voids and microporosity through a combination of plastic deformation, creep, and diffusion bonding; this process improves fatigue resistance of the component. Primary applications are the reduction of microshrinkage, the consolidation of powder metals, ceramic composites, and metal cladding. Hot isostatic pressing is thus also used as part of a sintering (powder metallurgy) process and for fabrication of metal matrix composites, often being used for postprocessing in additive manufacturing. Modern HIP equipment can combine subsequent heat treatment steps that generally follow HIP into what is called High-Pressure Heat Treatment. Also stress relief and aging can be made inside the HIP.

Moisture within the HIP vessel is a concern for materials that react to oxygen in a heated atmosphere, such as titanium and Ni-based superalloys. The oxidation that occurs in the material reduces fatigue life and must be machined, either mechanically or chemically, before the material is used. However, new HIP developments allow HIP to be made in a clean atmosphere—absent of moisture and oxygen, removing the need to mill the material post-HIP.

The process can be used to produce waste forms. Calcined radioactive waste (waste with additives) is packed into a thin-walled metal canister. The adsorbed gases are removed with high heat, and the remaining material compressed to full density using argon gas during the heat cycle. This process can shrink steel canisters to minimize space in disposal containers and during transport. It was invented in the 1950s at the Battelle Memorial Institute and has been used to prepare nuclear fuel for submarines since the 1960s. It is used to prepare inactive ceramics as well, and the Idaho National Laboratory has validated it for the consolidation of radioactive ceramic waste forms. ANSTO (Australian Nuclear Science and Technology Organisation) is using HIP as part of a process to immobilize waste radionuclides from molybdenum-99 production.
