= Alpha case =

Oxygen-rich surface layer on titanium

In metallurgy, alpha case is the oxygen-enriched surface phase that occurs when titanium and its alloys are exposed to heated air or oxygen. Alpha case is hard and brittle, and tends to create a series of microcracks that will reduce the metal's performance and its fatigue properties. Alpha case can be minimized or avoided by processing titanium at very deep vacuum levels. However once present on the surface, the currently applied method to remove the alpha case is by the subtractive methods of machining and/or chemical milling. An emerging technique is to subject the metal to an electrochemical treatment in molten salts, such as calcium chloride or lithium chloride at elevated temperatures. This method removes the dissolved oxygen from the alpha case, hence restoring the oxygen-free metal. However, an unwanted consequence of the high temperature treatment is the growth of the grains in the metal. Grain growth may be limited by lowering the molten salt temperature. Alternatively, the metal may be rolling-pressed again to break the large grains into smaller ones.
