= Spark plasma sintering =

Sintering technique

Spark plasma sintering (SPS), also known as field assisted sintering technique (FAST) or pulsed electric current sintering (PECS), or plasma pressure compaction (P2C) is a sintering technique.

The main characteristic of SPS is that the pulsed or unpulsed DC or AC current directly passes through the graphite die, as well as the powder compact, in case of conductive samples. Joule heating has been found to play a dominant role in the densification of powder compacts, which results in achieving near theoretical density at lower sintering temperature compared to conventional sintering techniques. The heat generation is internal, in contrast to the conventional hot pressing, where the heat is provided by external heating elements. This facilitates a very high heating or cooling rate (up to 1000 K/min), hence the sintering process generally is very fast (within a few minutes). The general speed of the process ensures it has the potential of densifying powders with nanosize or nanostructure while avoiding coarsening which accompanies standard densification routes. This has made SPS a good method for preparation of a range of materials with enhanced magnetic, magnetoelectric, piezoelectric, thermoelectric, optical, shock compression, or biomedical properties. SPS is also used for sintering of carbon nanotubes for development of field electron emission electrodes. Functioning of SPS systems is schematically explained in a video link. While the term "spark plasma sintering" is commonly used, the term is misleading since neither a spark nor a plasma is present in the process. It has been experimentally verified that densification is facilitated by the use of a current. SPS can be used as a tool for the creation of functionally graded soft-magnetic materials and it is useful in accelerating the development of magnetic materials. It has been found that this process improves the oxidation resistance and wear resistance of sintered tungsten carbide composites compared to conventional consolidation methods.

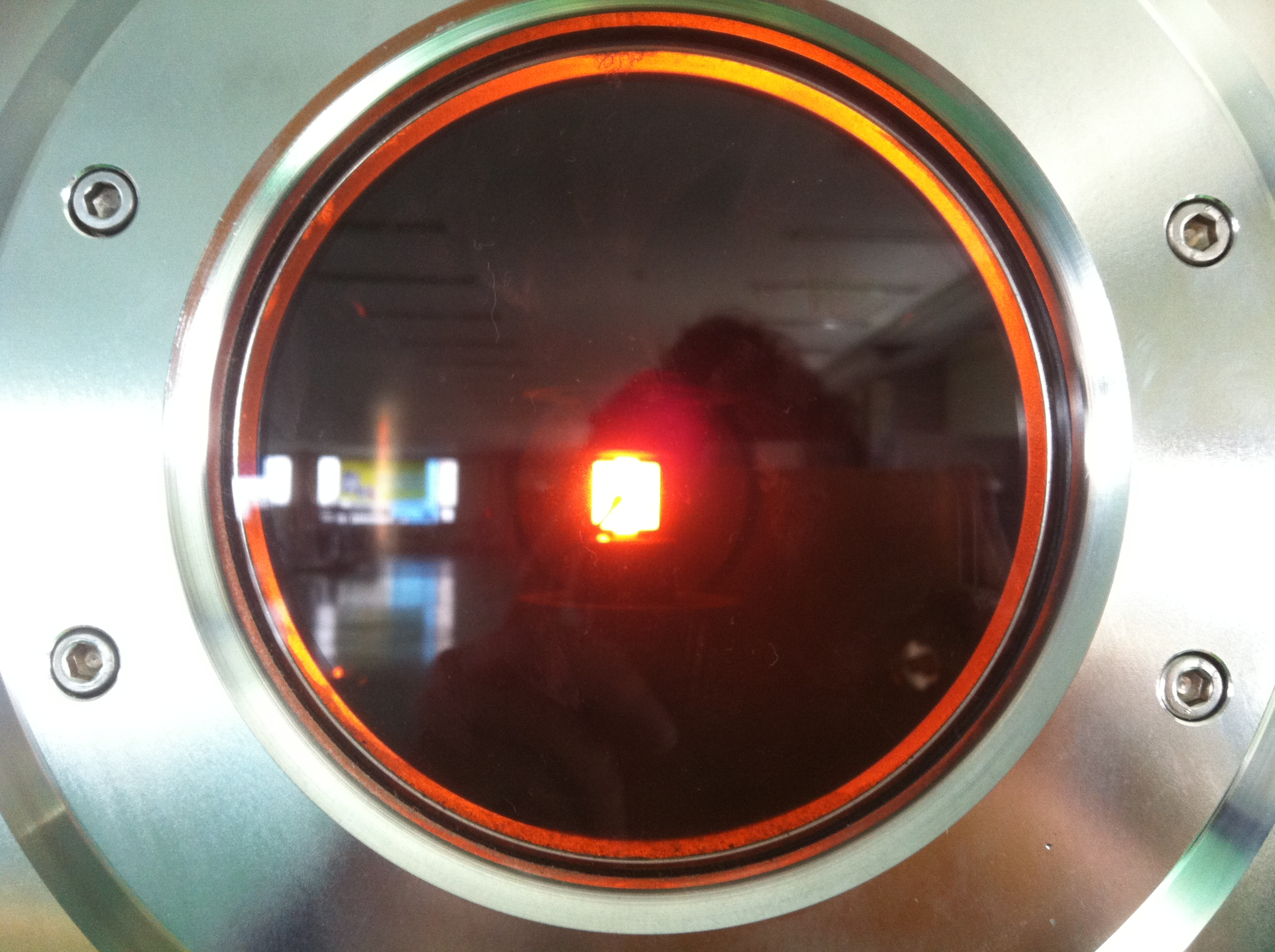
A kind of sintering that involves both temperature and pressure

== Hybrid heating ==
By means of a combination of the FAST/SPS method with one or several additional heating systems acting from the outside of the pressing tool systems it's possible to minimize the thermal gradients thus allowing the enhancement of the heating rates at simultaneously optimized homogeneity.

In 2012 the world's largest hybrid SPS-hot press sintering system was set up in Spain and the fabrication of fully dense large ceramic blanks of up to 400mm with this system is in progress within the frame of the FP7 European Project HYMACER - Hybrid sintering and advanced machining of technical ceramics

Spark plasma sintering, also known as plasma pressure compaction (P2C) sintering, equipment are commercially available now and are no longer limited to laboratory research work. Products like body armor, rocket nozzles, carbon fiber composites and several other hybrid materials can be produced in commercial scale using these equipment.

== See also ==
- Electric current assisted sintering – Process of forming and bonding material by heat or pressure
