= Electro sinter forging =

Electro sinter forging (ESF) is an industrial single electromagnetic pulse sintering technique to rapidly produce a wide range of small components in metals, alloys, intermetallics, semiconductors, and composites. ESF was invented by Alessandro Fais, an Italian metallurgical engineer and scientist.

ESF is obtained by inserting loose, binder-less powders into the automatic dosing system, or manually inserted in the mold. The automatic procedure applies a pre-pressure onto the powders to ensure electrical contact; hence, it superimposes an intense electromagnetic pulse with a mechanical pulse. The two pulses last 30 to 100 ms. After a brief holding time, the sintered component is extracted by the lower plunger and pushed out by the extractor to leave room for the next sintering. Each sintering round lasts less than one second, and is carried out entirely in air (even with pyrophoric materials).
