= Green body =

Ceramic material

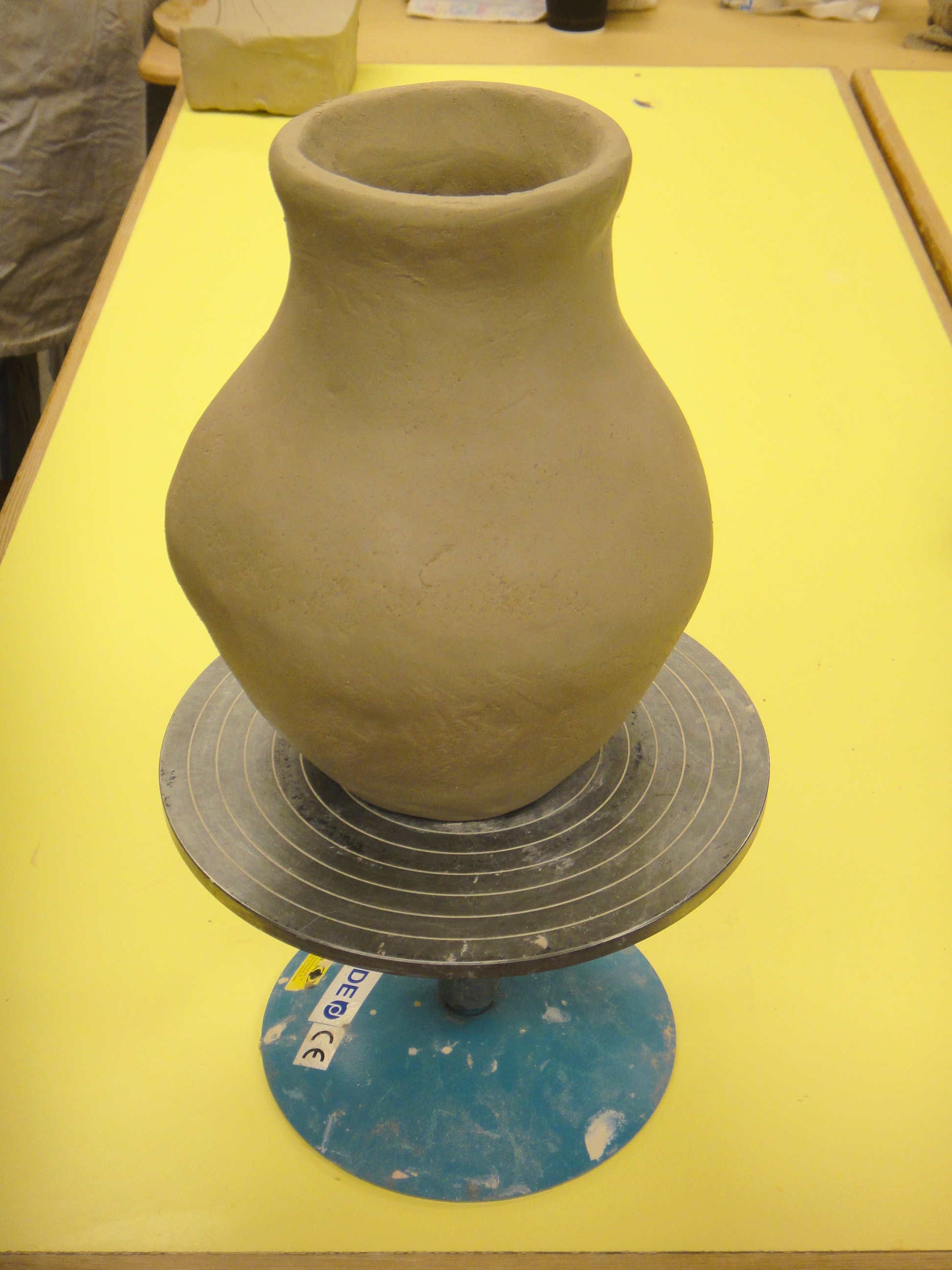
Unfired clay is a common example of a green body.

A green body is an object whose main constituent is weakly bound clay material, usually in the form of bonded powder or plates before it has been sintered or fired.

In ceramic engineering, the most common method for producing ceramic components is to form a green body comprising a mixture of the ceramic material and various organic or inorganic additives, and then to fire it in a kiln to produce a strong, vitrified object. Additives can serve as solvents, dispersants (deflocculants), binders, plasticizers, lubricants, or wetting agents.

This method is used because of difficulties with the casting of ceramics — due to their extremely high melting temperature and viscosity (relative to other materials such as metals and polymers).

== See also ==
- Compaction of ceramic powders
- Ceramic art
- Pottery
- Solid state chemistry
