= Ceramic molding =

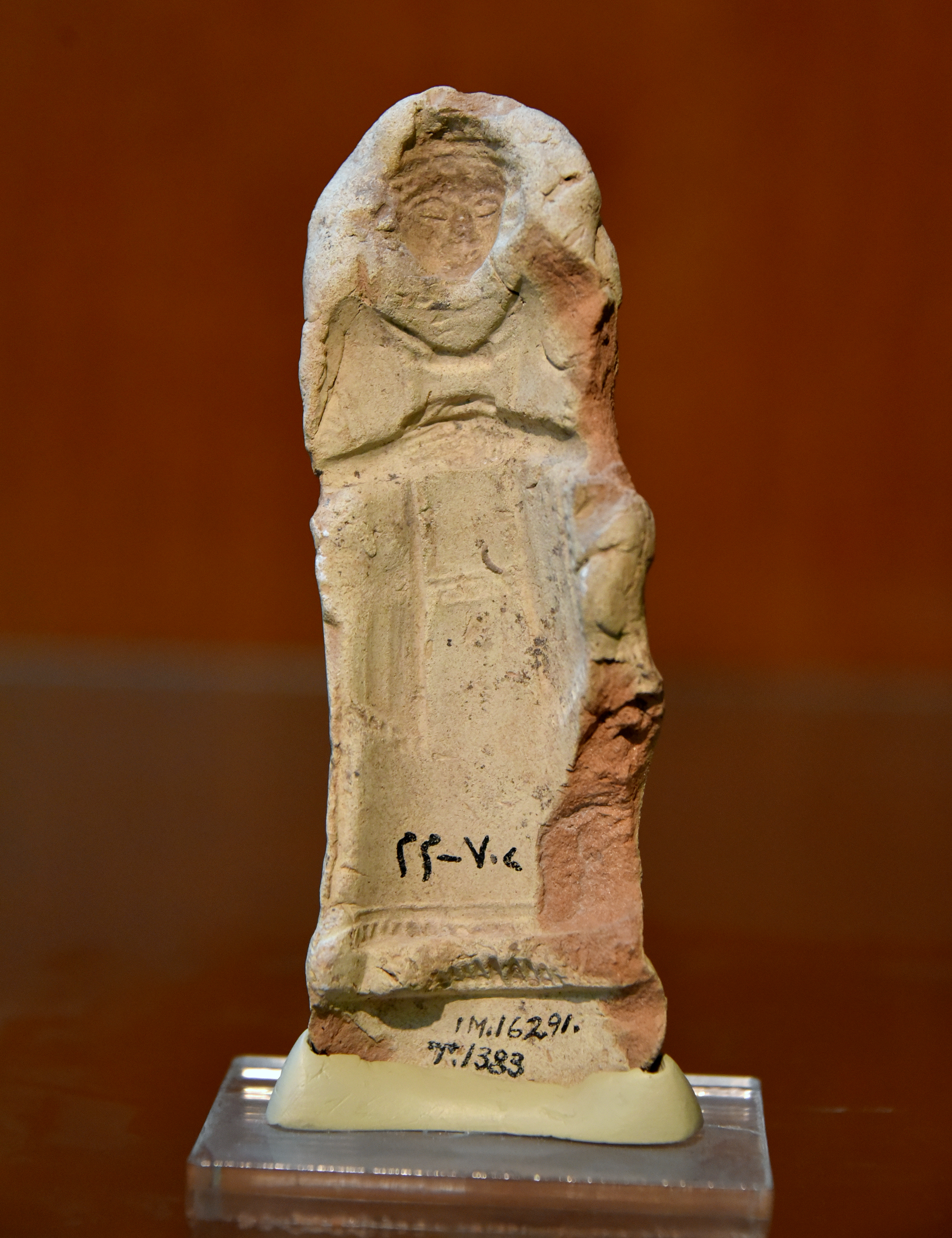
Clay mould for ceramic (fired clay) plaques, from Southern Mesopotamia, Iraq

Ceramic molding is a versatile and precise manufacturing process that transforms clay or porcelain into intricate shapes. Employing techniques like slip casting or press molding, artisans create precise replicas of original models. After molding, the ceramics are fired at high temperatures, ensuring durability and aesthetic appeal. This method is favored for producing intricate pottery, decorative tiles, and even complex industrial components. With its ability to capture fine details and yield consistent results, ceramic molding remains a cornerstone in the world of artistic and functional ceramic production.

== History & Archaeology ==
Ceramic molding, an ancient practice dating back centuries, emerged following humanity's discovery of fire. The experimentation with clay and fire marked the inception of the technique now known as ceramic molding or pottery. Archaeologists have unearthed various types of pottery, each intricately connected to the historical context of the locations where they were discovered. Historians, leveraging the examination of pottery and clay, have pinpointed specific dates and times of significant events. Through meticulous analysis of these artifacts, historians can precisely determine their age, enabling accurate estimations of when historical events transpired.

== Process ==
1. Pattern Creation

Craft the pattern using versatile materials such as plastic, wood, or metal. These materials should withstand extreme temperatures.

2. Binder Injection

Inject the mix into a binder to form a base for the molding process.

3. Refractory Ceramic Powder Addition

Extract a portion of refractory ceramic powder to enhance the molding mixture.

4. Special Gelling Incorporation

Introduce a specialized gelling agent into the binder, ensuring thorough mixing.

5. Slurry Placement

Place the slurry mixture into the pattern, forming the desired shape for the ceramic mold.

6. High-Temperature Heating

Subject the slurry-filled pattern to high temperatures, allowing for proper curing and shaping of the ceramic mold.

7. Cooling Phase

Cool the molded slurry to finalize the ceramic casting process.

== See also ==
- Ceramic forming techniques
- Ceramic mold casting

== Sources ==
- https://web.archive.org/web/20110717162640/http://www.unicastdev.com/process.htm
- http://www.freepatentsonline.com/5266252.html
