= Ceramicist =

Ceramicist may refer to a person working in:

- Ceramic art, for the art form
- Ceramic engineering, for the branch of materials science
- a studio potter
