= Mechanical powder press =

A mechanical powder press is a machine press designed to compress powders, commonly used in the production of technical ceramics.

== Function-Principles of mechanical presses in the field of Technical Ceramics ==
The function principles of the mechanic press machines differ in how to ensure the upper punch–main movement by cams, spindles-and friction drives, eccentric, knuckle-joints or by the round table principle, independent if the die-or lower punch movement is realized by cams- or eccentric systems or other mechanically or hydraulically combined systems. The executions of auxiliary movements are also not decisive for a term-classification. These auxiliary movements can also base on pneumatic and hydraulic principles. In comparison to hydraulic press machines the maximum compaction forces of mechanical powder presses are limited and are placed in the range >/= 5000 kN. For the requirements of wet-and dry pressing techniques in the field of Technical Ceramics cams-, eccentric-, knuckle joint- as well as round table presses have proved and tested, whereas cam-presses especially used for wet-press-techniques of pourable materials. The range of compaction force of mechanical presses for products of the Technical Ceramics is < 2500 kN, what is caused from the less density of the ceramic materials. Normally the upper punch-, lower punch- and die systems of mechanical presses don’t work on base of multi-subdivided punches.

== Application-Advantages in the field of Technical Ceramics ==
Adaptable cam-executions, which can be made suitable individually to the concerned products, will meet especially the requirements of wet-press-technique of pourable compounds, while applications of eccentric-, knuckle-joint and round table presses are particularly related on the dry-press-technique of compounds with gliding characteristics. The sinusoidal movement of eccentric presses offers advantages especially for bigger strokes < 100 strokes per minute and the distorted sinusoidal movement of the knuckle joint is especially used for products, which need a longer time for deairing in the phase of compaction and a longer time for decompression after the bottom dead centre. For this kind of compaction technology the strokes are limited < 35 strokes per minute, but in contrast to that the compaction speed of round table presses for small and simple shaped products are especially high and quantities < 30,000 pcs per minute can be realized.

== Context between ceramic compaction technology and design principles of the mechanical presses ==
The unit of product–technology–press machine / tooling is characterizing the context between the ceramic compaction technology and the design principles of the mechanical presses. Distinctions of the die- withdrawal- and the ejection technology of the uniaxial dry- and wet-press- technique in the technical ceramics influence the approachable quality of the compactions in depending on the geometric shape of the products and in depending on the selected type of press. Because the achievement of a speed-proportional compaction relation with pure mechanical presses is very difficult to realize and high mechanical investments are necessary, more and more combined mechanic-hydraulic function principles on base of subdivided punches will win a higher signification, because the requirements of the high-accuracy-pressing can be met better. The design principles of particularly mechanical powder presses, explained in a dissertation of Dr.B.Froherz offer some base confrontation of advantages and disadvantages related to technology and presses especially for tool designers.

== See also ==
- Eccentric (mechanism)
- Cold compaction
- Ceramic engineering
- Powder metallurgy
