= Ceramic engine =

Engine with large amounts of ceramics

A ceramic engine is an internal combustion engine made from specially engineered ceramic materials. Ceramic engines allow for the compression and expansion of gases at extremely high temperatures without loss of heat or engine damage. Proof-of-concept ceramic engines were popularized by successful studies in the early 1980s and 1990s. Under controlled laboratory conditions, ceramic engines outperformed traditional metal engines in terms of weight, efficiency, and performance. All-ceramic engines were seen as the next advancement in future engine technology, but have not yet entered the automobile market because of manufacturing and economic problems.

== History ==
Research into more efficient diesel engines occurred after the 1970s energy crisis, resulting in a new market for fuel-efficient vehicles. A newly developed gas turbine engine design promised high thermal efficiency, but needed a material that could withstand 2,500 °F (1,370 °C) temperatures. The high heat did not allow for readily available materials like metals, superalloys, and carbon composites to be used. As a result, government-funded research facilities in the United States, Japan, Germany, and the United Kingdom experimented with replacing metal with ceramics. Ceramics' high resistance to heat helped pave the way toward the first commercial use of gas turbine engines, the successes of which led to the idea of an all-ceramic engine.

Between 1985 and 1989, Nissan, in collaboration with NGK, produced the world's first ceramic turbocharger, later debuting this on the 1985 Fairlady Z 200ZR. Isuzu developed a diesel ceramic engine that used ceramic for the pistons, piston rings, and turbocharger wheels. Isuzu also developed an engine that used cylinder liners made of ceramic materials such as silicon nitride. Isuzu also used ceramics for the intake and exhaust valves, exhaust manifold, turbocharger housing, camshafts, heat insulation, and rocker arms.

Predictions for an adiabatic turbo-compound engine (a theoretical heat-efficient engine) were seen as plausible with the use of technical ceramic material. A 1987 technical paper by Roy Kamo predicted the mass production of such engines to occur in the year 2000. However, these predictions were made with the belief that ceramics would overcome "the design methodology, manufacturing process, machining cost, and mass production quality control needed for high volume production."

Currently, ceramic engines are not viable for mass production. Large parts, like the engine block, can be challenging to manufacture out of ceramics due to their brittleness and stiffness.

== Applications ==
In 1982, Isuzu tested a car with an all-ceramic engine near the Kinko Bay.

In 1988, Toyota introduced a ceramic engine into its Crown, as well as its GTV (Gas Turbine Vehicle) concept car.
