= Ceramic mold casting =

Method of casting metals

Ceramic mold casting, also known ambiguously as ceramic molding, is a group of metal casting processes that use ceramics as the mold material. It is a combination of plaster mold casting and investment casting. There are two types of ceramic mold casting: the Shaw process and the Unicast process.

These casting processes are commonly used to make tooling, especially drop forging dies, but also injection molding dies, die casting dies, glass molds, stamping dies, and extrusion dies.

== Shaw process ==
The Shaw process, also known as the Osborn-Shaw process, uses a mixture of refractory aggregate, hydrolyzed ethyl silicate, alcohol, and a gelling agent to create a mold. This slurry mixture is poured into a slightly tapered flask and a reusable pattern (i.e. the item used to create the shape of the mold) is used. The slurry hardens almost immediately to a rubbery state (the consistency of vulcanized rubber). The flask and pattern is then removed. Then a torch is used to ignite the mold, which causes most of the volatiles to burn-off and the formation of ceramic microcrazes (microscopic cracks). These cracks are important, because they allow gases to escape while preventing the metal from flowing through; they also ease thermal expansion and contraction during solidification and shrinkage. After the burn-off, the mold is baked at 1,800 °F (980 °C) to remove any remaining volatiles. Prior to pouring metal, the mold is pre-warmed to control shrinkage.

== Unicast process ==
The Unicast process is very similar to the Shaw process, except it does not require the mold to be ignited and then be cured in a furnace. Instead, the mold is partially cured so the pattern can be removed and it is then completely cured by firing it at approximately 1,900 °F (1,040 °C). If a metal with a low melting point is cast then the firing can be skipped, because the mold has enough strength in the "green state" (un-fired).

== Characteristics ==
The main advantages of ceramic molds are: a reusable pattern (the item used to create the shape of the mold), excellent surface finish, close dimensional tolerances, thin cross-sections, and intricate shapes can be cast. For undercuts and other difficult to cast features, part of the pattern can be made from wax in conjunction with a standard pattern; essentially using investment and ceramic mold casting techniques together. The main disadvantages are: it is only cost effective for small- to medium-sized production runs and the ceramic is not reusable. Ferrous and high-temperature non-ferrous are most commonly cast with these processes; other materials cast include: aluminum, copper, magnesium, titanium, and zinc alloys.

Weight limits are 100 grams to several thousand kilograms (3.5 oz to several tons). Cross-sections as thin as 1.3 mm (0.051 in) are possible, with no upper limit. Typical tolerances are 0.1 mm for the first 25 mm (0.005 in for the first inch) and 0.003 mm per additional mm (0.003 in per each additional in). A draft of 1° is typically required. The typical surface finish is 2–4 um (75–150 uin) RMS.

== See also ==
- Ceramic forming techniques
