= Compaction of ceramic powders =

Compaction of ceramic powders is a forming technique for ceramics in which granular ceramic materials are made cohesive through mechanical densification, either by hot or cold pressing. The resulting green part must later be sintered in a kiln. The compaction process permits an efficient production of parts to close tolerances with low drying shrinkage. It can be used for parts ranging widely in size and shape, and for both technical and nontechnical ceramics.

== Background: traditional & advanced ceramics ==
The ceramics industry is broadly developed in the world. In Europe alone, the current investment is estimated at € 26 billion. Advanced ceramics are crucial for new technologies, particularly thermo-mechanical and bio-medical applications, while traditional ceramics have a worldwide market and have been suggested as materials to minimize the impact on the environment (when compared to other finishing materials).

== The production process of ceramics ==
Up-to-date ceramic technology involves invention and design of new components and optimization of production processes of complex structures. Ceramics can be formed by a variety of different methods which can be divided into three main groups, depending on whether the starting materials involve a gas, a liquid, or a solid. Examples of methods involving gases are: chemical vapour deposition, directed metal oxidation and reaction bonding. Examples of methods involving liquids are: sol-gel process and polymer pyrolysis. Methods involving solids, especially powder methods, dominate ceramic forming and are extensively used in the industry.

The practical realization of ceramic products by powder methods requires the following steps: ceramic powder production, powder treatment, handling and processing, cold forming, sintering, and evaluation of the performance of the final product. Since these processes permit an efficient production of parts ranging widely in size and shape to close tolerances, there is an evident interest in industry. For instance, metallurgical, pharmaceutical, and traditional and advanced structural ceramics represent common applications.

== Mechanics of forming of ceramic powders ==
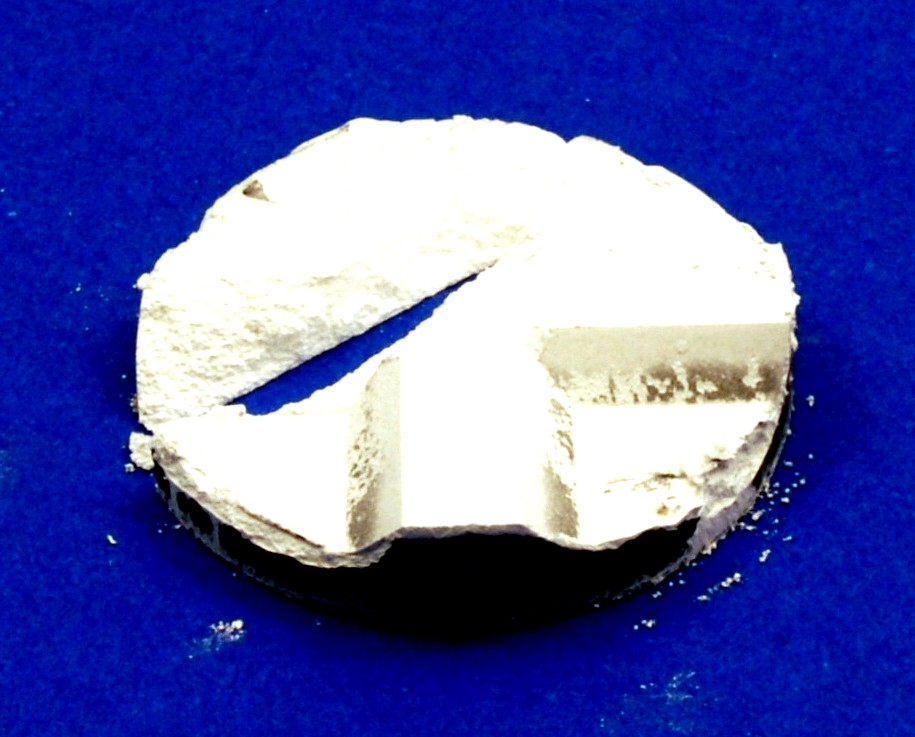
Fig. 1 A piece (formed with M KMS-96 alumina powder) has been broken after mold ejection.

It is a well-established fact that the performance of a ceramic component critically depends on the manufacturing process. Initial powder characteristics and processing, including cold forming and sintering, have a strong impact on the mechanical properties of the components as they may generate a defect population (microcracks, density gradients, pores, agglomerates) within the green and sintered compounds. The mechanical characteristics of the solid obtained after cold forming (the so-called ‘green body’) strongly affect the subsequent sintering process and thus the mechanical properties of the final piece.

Many technical, still unresolved difficulties arise in the forming process of ceramic materials. On the one hand the compact should result to be intact after ejection, it should be handleable without failure and essentially free of macro defects. On the other hand, defects of various nature are always present in the green bodies, negatively affecting local shrinkage during sintering, Fig. 1.

Defects can be caused by the densification process, which may involve highly inhomogeneous strain fields, or by mold ejection. Currently, there is a high production rejection rate, due to the fact that manufacturing technologies are mainly based on empirically engineered processes, rather than on rational and scientific methodologies.

Fig. 2 Micrographs of a M KMS-96 alumina powder. The loose state is shown on the left, while granule arrangements corresponding to Phases I and II of the compaction process are shown on the centre and on the right. Note the plastic deformation of grains visible on the right.

The industrial technologies involved in the production of ceramics, with particular reference to tile and sanitaryware products, generate a huge amount of waste of material and energy. (Note: For the raw material grinding, big mills (with an installed power of up to a 1 MW) are used to reduce the particle size of the slip but the most power is lost just to increase the temperature of the slip itself. For the drying of the slip, big spray driers are used with up to 500 KW electrical power and 15.000.000 Kcal/h of thermal power : 80% of the thermal capacity of the machine is lost at the chimney with not a negligible percentage of the powder itself lost in the environment. For the forming of the powder, big presses (up to 7.500 ton of force and 250 KW of installed power) are used but only 5% of this energy is contained in the compacted final product. In the following step of drying and sintering, big burners with a consumption of 10.000.000 Kcal/h are used but most of the energy is wasted at the chimney. A big volume of waste glaze is also produced along the glazing line and only a little can be recycled in the plant itself. Even a small increase of the mechanical strength of the ceramic body would lead to a reduction in the weight of the ceramic article with a deepreduction of the above pollution effects.) Consequently, the set-up of manufacturing processes is very costly and time consuming and not yet optimal in terms of quality of the final piece.

There is therefore a strong interest from the ceramic industry in the availability of tools capable of modelling and simulating: i) the powder compaction process and ii) the criticality of defects possibly present in the final piece after sintering. Recently, an EU IAPP research project has been financed with the aim of enhance mechanical modelling of ceramic forming in view of industrial applications.

During cold powder compaction, a granular material is made cohesive through mechanical densification, a process for which modelling requires the description of the transition from a granular to a dense and even a fully dense state (Fig. 2).

Fig. 3 The hardening process during hydrostatic powder compaction described with the Bigoni & Piccolroaz yield surface.

Since granular materials are characterized by mechanical properties almost completely different from those typical of dense solids, the mechanical modelling must describe a transition between two distinctly different states of a material. This is a scientific challenge addressed by Piccolroaz et al. in terms of plasticity theory. A key point in their analysis is the use of the ‘Bigoni & Piccolroaz yield surface’, previously developed, see Fig. 3.

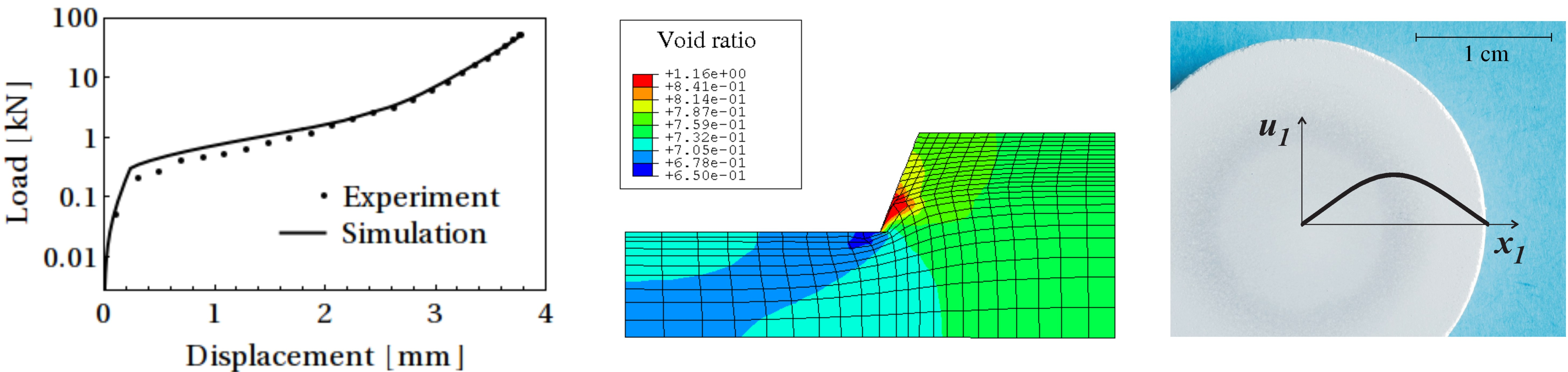
Fig. 4 A mechanical model of ceramic forming correctly predicts: (left) the load/displacement curve during cold pressing, (centre) the density (void ratio) map within a formed piece and (right) the dark annular region evidenced on the bottom of a formed piece.

The mechanical model developed by Piccoloraz et al. (2006 a;b) permits the description of the forming process (Fig. 4). The INTERCER2 research project is aimed to develop novel constitutive descriptions for ceramic powders and more robust implementation in a numerical code.

== See also ==
- Powder Metallurgy
- Plasticity
- Yield surface
- Ceramic forming techniques
- Mechanical powder press
