= Ceramic engineering =

Science and technology of creating objects from inorganic, non-metallic materials

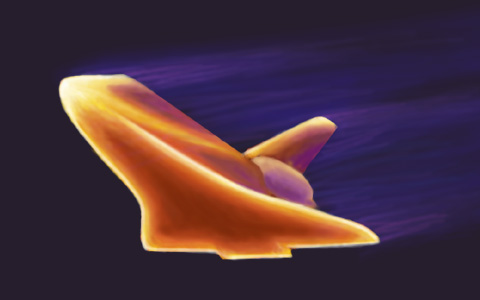
Simulation of the outside of the Space Shuttle as it heats up to over 1,500 °C (2,730 °F) during re-entry into the Earth's atmosphere

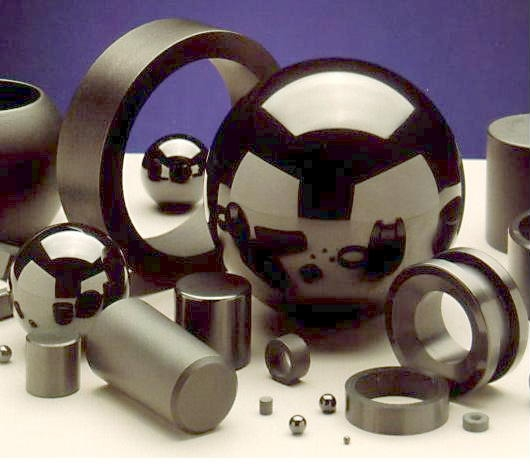
Bearing components made from 100% silicon nitride Si_{3}N_{4}

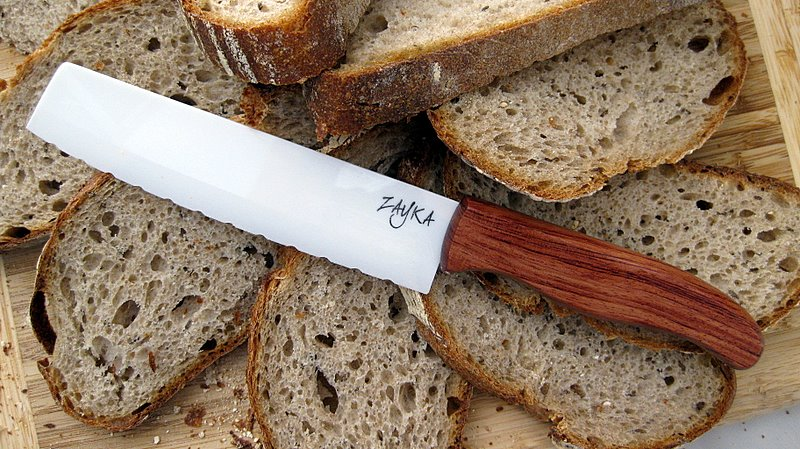
Ceramic bread knife

Ceramic engineering is the science of creating objects from inorganic, non-metallic materials. This is done using either heat or precipitation reactions on high-purity chemical solutions at lower temperatures. The term includes the purification of raw materials, the study and production of chemical compounds, their formation into components, and the study of their structure, composition, and properties.

Ceramic materials may have a crystalline or partly crystalline structure, with long-range order on atomic scale. Glass-ceramics may have an amorphous or glassy structure. They can be formed from a molten mass that solidifies on cooling or chemically synthesized at low temperatures using methods such as hydrothermal synthesis.

Ceramic materials are used in the fields of materials engineering, electrical engineering, chemical engineering and mechanical engineering. Ceramics are heat resistant, so they can be used for tasks in which materials like metal and polymers are unsuitable.

== History ==
Ceramic engineering, like many sciences, evolved from a different discipline. Materials science and engineering is commonly considered the origins of ceramics engineering.

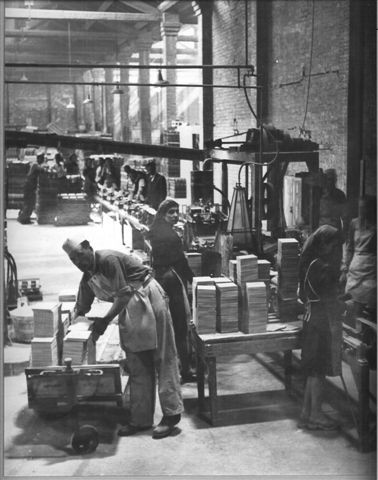
Leo Morandi's tile glazing line (circa 1945)

Abraham Darby first used coke in 1709 in Shropshire, England, to improve the yield of a smelting process. Coke is now widely used to produce carbide ceramics. Potter Josiah Wedgwood opened the first modern ceramics factory in Stoke-on-Trent, England, in 1759. Austrian chemist Carl Josef Bayer, working for the textile industry in Russia, developed a process to separate alumina from bauxite ore in 1888. The Bayer process is still used to purify alumina for the ceramic and aluminum industries. Brothers Pierre and Jacques Curie discovered piezoelectricity in Rochelle salt c. 1880. Piezoelectricity is one of the key properties of electroceramics.

E.G. Acheson heated a mixture of coke and clay in 1893, and invented carborundum, or synthetic silicon carbide. Henri Moissan also synthesized silicon carbide and tungsten carbide in his electric arc furnace in Paris about the same time as Acheson. Karl Schröter used liquid-phase sintering to bond or "cement" Moissan's tungsten carbide particles with cobalt in 1923 in Germany. Cemented (metal-bonded) carbide edges greatly increase the durability of hardened steel cutting tools. W.H. Nernst developed cubic-stabilized zirconia in the 1920s in Berlin. This material is used as an oxygen sensor in exhaust systems. The main limitation on the use of ceramics in engineering is brittleness.

=== Military ===
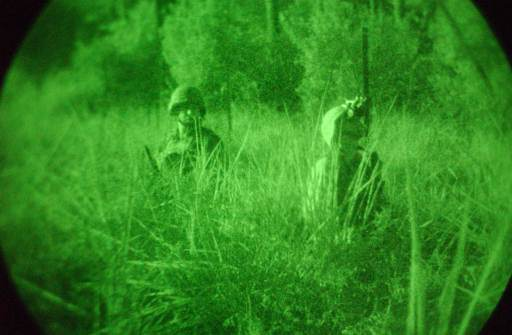
Soldiers pictured during the 2003 Iraq War seen through IR-transparent night vision goggles

The military requirements of World War II encouraged innovation, which created a need for high-performance materials and helped speed the development of ceramic science and engineering. Throughout the 1960s and 1970s, new types of ceramics were developed in response to advances in atomic energy, electronics, communications, and space travel. The discovery of ceramic superconductors in 1986 has spurred research to develop superconducting ceramic parts for electronic devices, electric motors, and transportation equipment.

There is an increasing need in the military sector for high-strength, robust materials which have the capability to transmit light around the visible (0.4–0.7 micrometers) and mid-infrared (1–5 micrometers) regions of the spectrum. These materials are needed for applications requiring transparent armor. Transparent armor is a material or system of materials designed to be optically transparent, yet protect from fragmentation or ballistic impacts. The primary requirement for a transparent armor system is to not only defeat the designated threat but also provide a multi-hit capability with minimized distortion of surrounding areas. Transparent armor windows must also be compatible with night vision equipment. New materials that are thinner, lightweight, and offer better ballistic performance are being sought.

Such solid-state components have found widespread use in the electro-optical field including optical fibers for guided light wave transmission, optical switches, laser amplifiers and lenses, hosts for solid-state lasers and optical window materials for gas lasers, and infrared (IR) heat seeking devices for missile guidance systems and IR night vision.

== Modern industry ==
Currently, ceramic engineering applications include the following:

- Zirconium dioxide ceramics are used in the manufacturing of knives. The blade of the ceramic knife will stay sharp for much longer than that of a steel knife, although it is more brittle and can be snapped by dropping it on a hard surface.
- Ceramics such as alumina, boron carbide and silicon carbide have been used in bulletproof vests to repel small arms rifle fire. Such plates are known commonly as ballistic plates. Similar material is used to protect cockpits of some military aircraft, because of the low weight of the material.
- Silicon nitride parts are used in ceramic ball bearings. Their higher hardness means that they are much less susceptible to wear and can offer more than triple lifetimes. They also deform less under load meaning they have less contact with the bearing retainer walls and can roll faster. In very high speed applications, heat from friction during rolling can cause problems for metal bearings; they are reduced by the use of ceramics. Ceramics are also more chemically resistant and can be used in wet environments where steel bearings would rust. In many cases their electrically insulating properties may also be valuable in bearings. The major drawback to using ceramics is a significantly higher cost.
- In the early 1980s, Toyota researched production of an adiabatic ceramic engine which can run at a temperature of over 6000 °F (3300 °C). Ceramic engines do not require a cooling system and hence allow a major weight reduction and therefore greater fuel efficiency. Fuel efficiency of the engine is also higher at high temperature, as shown by Carnot's theorem. In a conventional metallic engine, much of the energy released from the fuel must be dissipated as waste heat in order to prevent a meltdown of the metallic parts. Despite all of these desirable properties, such engines are not in production because the manufacturing of ceramic parts in the requisite precision and durability is difficult. Imperfection in the ceramic leads to cracks, which can lead to potentially dangerous equipment failure. Such engines are possible in laboratory settings, but mass-production is not feasible with current technology.
- Work is being done in developing ceramic parts for gas turbine engines. Currently, even blades made of advanced metal alloys used in the engines' hot section require cooling and careful limiting of operating temperatures. Turbine engines made with ceramics could operate more efficiently, giving aircraft greater range and payload for a set amount of fuel.

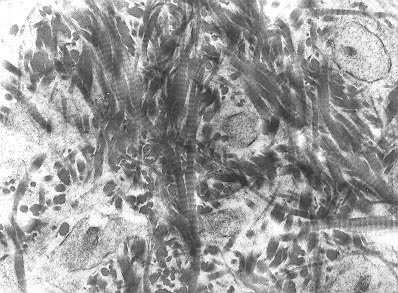
Collagen fibers of woven bone

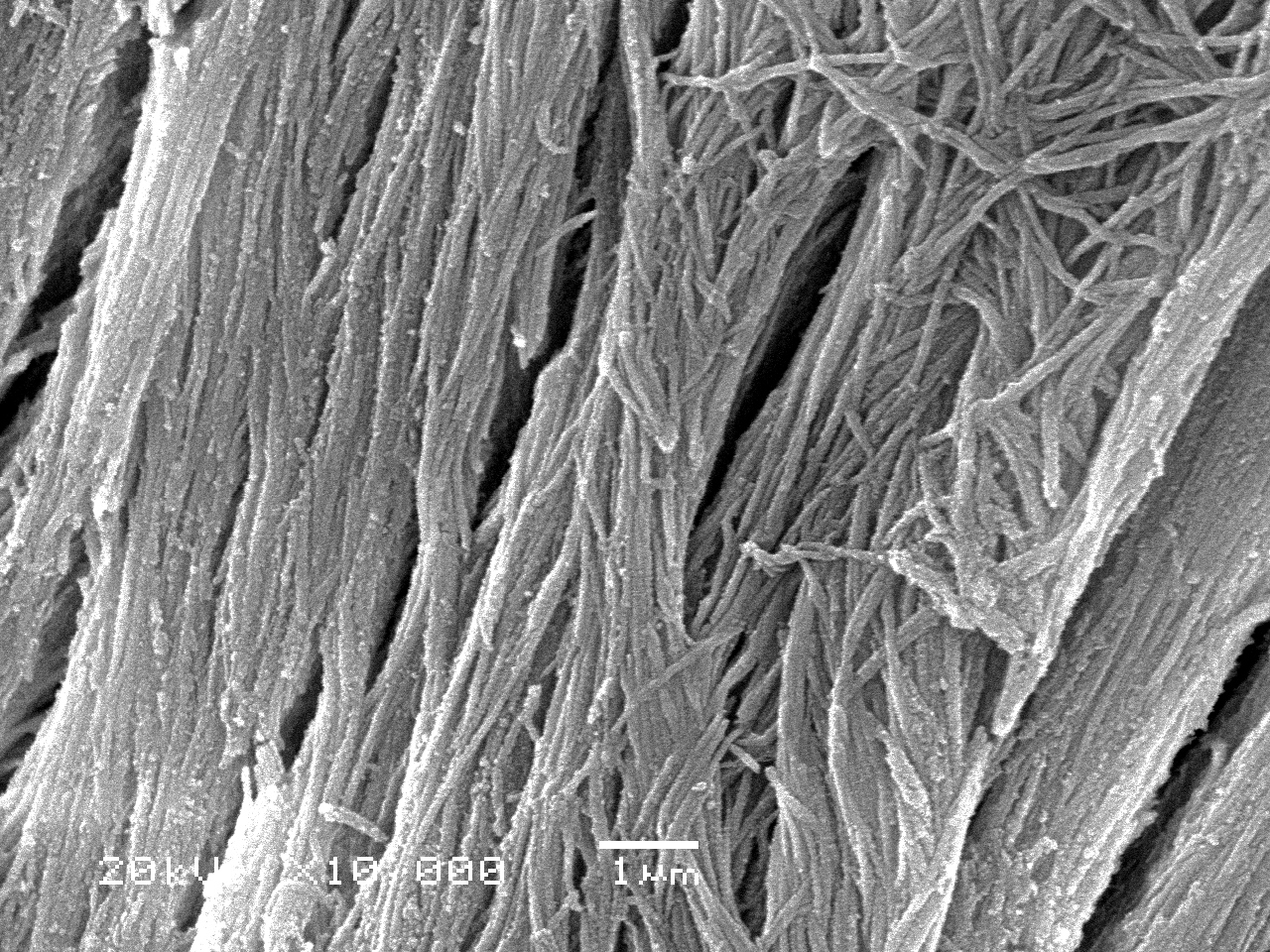
Scanning electron microscopy image of bone

- Recently, there have been advances in ceramics which include bio-ceramics, such as dental implants and synthetic bones. Hydroxyapatite, the natural mineral component of bone, has been made synthetically from a number of biological and chemical sources and can be formed into ceramic materials. Orthopedic implants made from these materials bond readily to bone and other tissues in the body without rejection or inflammatory reactions. Because of this, they are of great interest for gene delivery and tissue engineering scaffolds. Most hydroxyapatite ceramics are very porous and lack mechanical strength and are used to coat metal orthopedic devices to aid in forming a bond to bone or as bone fillers. They are also used as fillers for orthopedic plastic screws to aid in reducing the inflammation and increase absorption of these plastic materials. Work is being done to make strong, fully dense nano crystalline hydroxyapatite ceramic materials for orthopedic weight bearing devices, replacing foreign metal and plastic orthopedic materials with a synthetic, but naturally occurring, bone mineral. Ultimately these ceramic materials may be used as bone replacements or, with the incorporation of protein collagens, synthetic bones.
- Durable actinide-containing ceramic materials have applications such as in nuclear fuels for burning excess Pu and in chemically-inert sources of alpha irradiation for power supply of unmanned space vehicles or to produce electricity for microelectronic devices. Both use and disposal of radioactive actinides require their immobilization in a durable host material. Nuclear waste long-lived radionuclides such as actinides are immobilized using chemically-durable crystalline materials based on polycrystalline ceramics and large single crystals.
- Alumina ceramics are utilized in the chemical industry due to their chemical stability and high resistance to corrosion. It is used as acid-resistant pump impellers and pump bodies, ensuring long-lasting performance in transferring aggressive fluids. They are also used in acid-carrying pipe linings to prevent contamination and maintain fluid purity, which is crucial in industries like pharmaceuticals and food processing. Valves made from alumina ceramics have high durability and resistance to chemical attack, making them useful for controlling the flow of corrosive liquids.

== Glass-ceramics ==
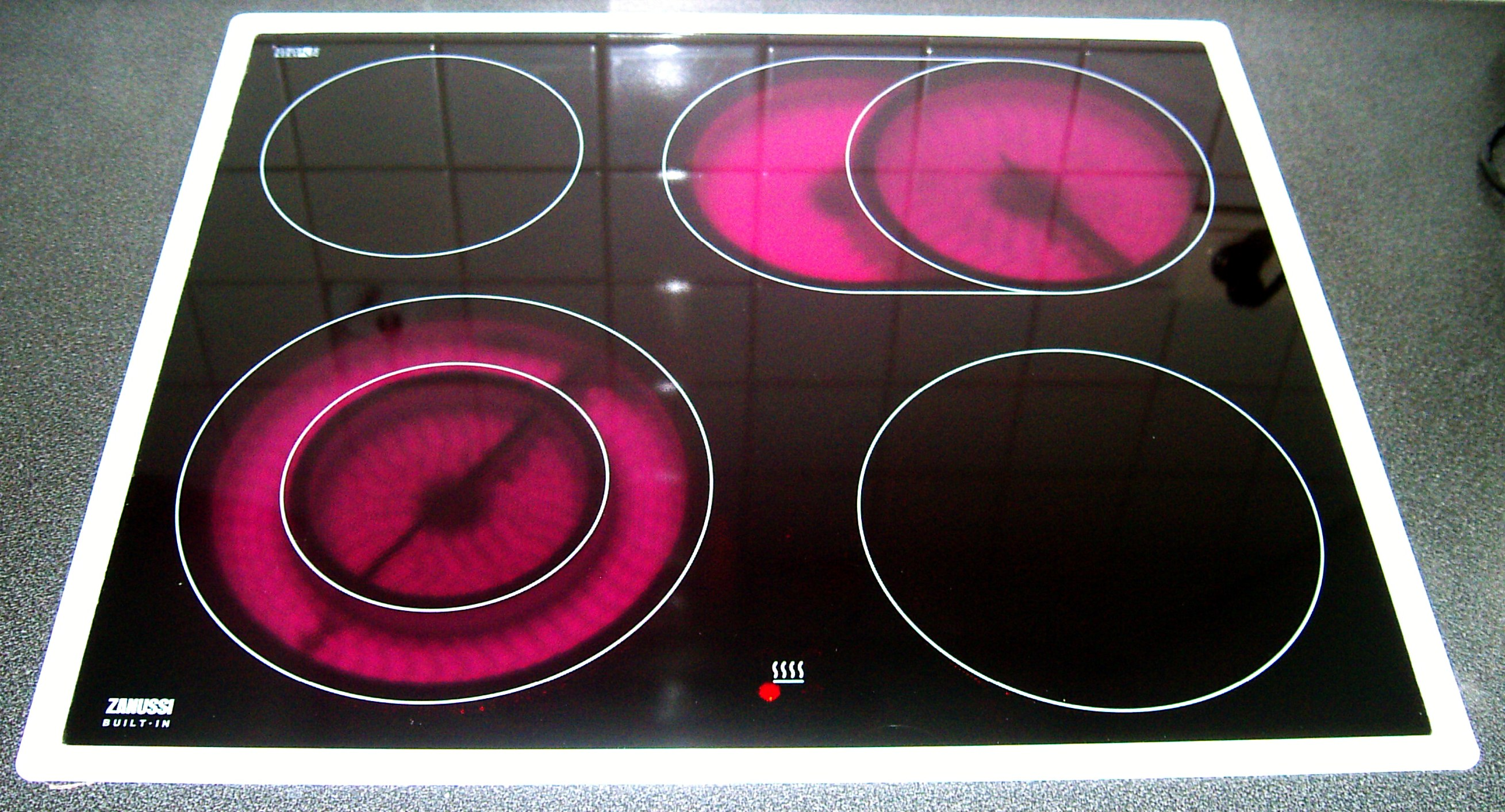
A high strength glass-ceramic cook-top with negligible thermal expansion.

Glass-ceramic materials share many properties with both glasses and ceramics. Glass-ceramics have an amorphous phase and one or more crystalline phases and are produced by a so-called "controlled crystallization", which is typically avoided in glass manufacturing. Glass-ceramics often contain a crystalline phase which constitutes anywhere from 30% [m/m] to 90% [m/m] of its composition by volume, yielding an array of materials with unusual thermomechanical properties.

In the processing of glass-ceramics, molten glass is cooled down gradually before reheating and annealing. In this heat treatment the glass partly crystallizes. In many cases, so-called 'nucleation agents' are added in order to regulate and control the crystallization process. Because there is usually no pressing and sintering, glass-ceramics do not contain the volume fraction of porosity typically present in sintered ceramics.

The term mainly refers to a mix of lithium and aluminosilicates. The most commercially important of these have the distinction of being impervious to thermal shock. Thus, glass-ceramics have become useful for countertop cooking. The negative thermal expansion coefficient (TEC) of the crystalline ceramic phase can be balanced with the positive TEC of the glassy phase. At a certain point (~70% crystalline) the glass-ceramic has a net TEC near zero. This type of glass-ceramic exhibits excellent mechanical properties and can sustain repeated and quick temperature changes of up to 1000 °C.

== Processing steps ==
The traditional ceramic process generally follows this sequence: Milling → Batching → Mixing → Forming → Drying → Firing → Assembly.

Ball mill

- Milling is the process by which materials are reduced from a large size to a smaller size. Milling may involve breaking up cemented material (in which case individual particles retain their shape) or pulverization (which involves grinding the particles themselves to a smaller size). Milling is generally done by mechanical means, including attrition (which is particle-to-particle collision that results in agglomerate break up or particle shearing), compression (which applies a forces that results in fracturing), and impact (which employs a milling medium or the particles themselves to cause fracturing). Attrition milling equipment includes the wet scrubber (also called the planetary mill or wet attrition mill), which has paddles in water creating vortexes in which the material collides and break up. Compression mills include the jaw crusher, roller crusher and cone crusher. Impact mills include the ball mill, which has media that tumble and fracture the material, or the ResonantAcoustic mixer. Shaft impactors cause particle-to particle attrition and compression.
- Batching is the process of weighing the oxides according to recipes, and preparing them for mixing and drying.
- Mixing occurs after batching and is performed with various machines, such as dry-mixing ribbon mixers, ResonantAcoustic mixers, Mueller mixers, and pug mills. Wet mixing generally involves the same equipment.
- Forming is making the mixed material into shapes, ranging from toilet bowls to spark plug insulators. Forming can involve: (1) Extrusion, such as extruding "slugs" to make bricks, (2) Pressing to make shaped parts, (3) Slip casting, as in making toilet bowls, wash basins and ornamentals like ceramic statues. Forming produces a "green" part, ready for drying. Green parts are soft, pliable, and over time will lose shape. Handling the green product will change its shape. For example, a green brick can be "squeezed", and after squeezing it will stay that way.
- Drying is removing the water or binder from the formed material. Spray drying is widely used to prepare powder for pressing operations. Other dryers are tunnel dryers and periodic dryers. Controlled heat is applied in this two-stage process. First, heat removes water. This step needs careful control, as rapid heating causes cracks and surface defects. The dried part is smaller than the green part, and is brittle, necessitating careful handling, since a small impact will cause crumbling and breaking.
- Sintering is where the dried parts pass through a controlled heating process, and the oxides are chemically changed to cause bonding and densification. The fired part will be smaller than the dried part.

== Forming methods ==
Ceramic forming techniques include throwing, slipcasting, tape casting, freeze-casting, injection molding, dry pressing, isostatic pressing, hot isostatic pressing (HIP), 3D printing and others. Methods for forming ceramic powders into complex shapes are desirable in many areas of technology. Such methods are required for producing advanced, high-temperature structural parts such as heat engine components and turbines. Materials other than ceramics which are used in these processes may include: wood, metal, water, plaster and epoxy—most of which will be eliminated upon firing. A ceramic-filled epoxy, such as Martyte, is sometimes used to protect structural steel under conditions of rocket exhaust impingement.

These forming techniques yield tools and other components with dimensional stability, surface quality, high (near theoretical) density and microstructural uniformity. The increasing use and diversity of specialty forms of ceramics adds to the diversity of process technologies to be used.

Thus, reinforcing fibers and filaments are mainly made by polymer, sol-gel, or CVD processes, but melt processing also has applicability. The most widely used specialty form is layered structures, with tape casting for electronic substrates and packages being pre-eminent. Photo-lithography is of increasing interest for precise patterning of conductors and other components for such packaging. Tape casting or forming processes are also of increasing interest for other applications, ranging from open structures such as fuel cells to ceramic composites.

The other major layer structure is coating, where thermal spraying is important, but chemical and physical vapor deposition and chemical (e.g., sol-gel and polymer pyrolysis) methods are all seeing increased use. Besides open structures from formed tape, extruded structures, such as honeycomb catalyst supports, and highly porous structures, including various foams, for example, reticulated foam, are of increasing use.

Densification of consolidated powder bodies continues to be achieved predominantly by (pressureless) sintering. However, the use of pressure sintering by hot pressing is increasing, especially for non-oxides and parts of simple shapes where higher quality (mainly microstructural homogeneity) is needed, and larger size or multiple parts per pressing can be an advantage.

== The sintering process ==
The principles of sintering-based methods are simple ("sinter" has roots in the English "cinder"). The firing is done at a temperature below the melting point of the ceramic. Once a roughly-held-together object called a "green body" is made, it is fired in a kiln, where atomic and molecular diffusion processes give rise to significant changes in the primary microstructural features. This includes the gradual elimination of porosity, which is typically accompanied by a net shrinkage and overall densification of the component. Thus, the pores in the object may close up, resulting in a denser product of significantly greater strength and fracture toughness.

Another major change in the body during the firing or sintering process will be the establishment of the polycrystalline nature of the solid. Significant grain growth tends to occur during sintering, with this growth depending on temperature and duration of the sintering process. The growth of grains will result in some form of grain size distribution, which will have a significant impact on the ultimate physical properties of the material. In particular, abnormal grain growth in which certain grains grow very large in a matrix of finer grains will significantly alter the physical and mechanical properties of the obtained ceramic. In the sintered body, grain sizes are a product of the thermal processing parameters as well as the initial particle size, or possibly the sizes of aggregates or particle clusters which arise during the initial stages of processing.

The microstructure (and thus the physical properties) of the final product will be limited by and subject to the form of the structural template or precursor which is created in the initial stages of chemical synthesis and physical forming. Hence the importance of chemical powder and polymer processing as it pertains to the synthesis of industrial ceramics, glasses and glass-ceramics.

There are numerous possible refinements of the sintering process. Some of the most common involve pressing the green body to give the densification a head start and reduce the sintering time needed. Sometimes organic binders such as polyvinyl alcohol are added to hold the green body together; these burn out during the firing between 200 °C and 350 °C. Sometimes organic lubricants are added during pressing to increase densification. It is common to combine these, and add binders and lubricants to a powder, then press. (The formulation of these organic chemical additives is a science itself. This is particularly important in the manufacture of high performance ceramics, such as those used by the billions for electronics, in capacitors, inductors, sensors, etc.)

A slurry can be used in place of a powder, and then cast into a desired shape, dried and then sintered. Indeed, traditional pottery is done with this type of method, using a plastic mixture worked with the hands. If a mixture of different materials is used together in a ceramic, the sintering temperature is sometimes above the melting point of one minor component – a liquid phase sintering. This results in shorter sintering times compared to solid state sintering. Such liquid phase sintering involves in faster diffusion processes and may result in abnormal grain growth.

== Strength of ceramics ==
A material's strength is dependent on its microstructure, which can be altered by the engineering processes to which it is subjected. The variety of strengthening mechanisms that alter the strength of a material include the mechanism of grain boundary strengthening. Thus, although yield strength is maximized with decreasing grain size, ultimately, very small grain sizes make the material brittle. Considered in tandem with the fact that the yield strength is the parameter that predicts plastic deformation in the material, one can make informed decisions on how to increase the strength of a material depending on its microstructural properties and the desired end effect.

The relation between yield stress and grain size is described mathematically by the Hall-Petch equation which is

$$\sigma_y = \sigma_0 + {k_y \over \sqrt {d}}$$

where k_{y} is the strengthening coefficient (a constant unique to each material), σ_{o} is a materials constant for the starting stress for dislocation movement (or the resistance of the lattice to dislocation motion), d is the grain diameter, and σ_{y} is the yield stress.

Theoretically, a material could be made infinitely strong if the grains are made infinitely small. This is, unfortunately, impossible because the lower limit of grain size is a single unit cell of the material. Even then, if the grains of a material are the size of a single unit cell, then the material is in fact amorphous, not crystalline, since there is no long range order, and dislocations cannot be defined in an amorphous material. It has been observed experimentally that the microstructure with the highest yield strength is a grain size of about 10 nanometers, because grains smaller than this undergo another yielding mechanism called grain boundary sliding. Producing engineering materials with this ideal grain size is difficult because of the limitations of initial particle sizes inherent to nanomaterials and nanotechnology.

== Faber-Evans model ==
The Faber-Evans model, developed by Katherine Faber and Anthony G. Evans, can predict the increase in fracture toughness in ceramics due to crack deflection around second-phase particles that are prone to microcracking in a matrix. The model considers particle morphology, aspect ratio, spacing, and volume fraction of the second phase, as well as the reduction in local stress intensity at the crack tip when the crack is deflected or the crack plane bows. Actual crack tortuosity is obtained through imaging techniques, which allows for the direct input of deflection and bowing angles into the model.

The model calculates the average strain energy release rate and compares the resulting increase in fracture toughness to that of a flat crack through the plain matrix. The magnitude of the toughening is determined by the mismatch strain caused by thermal contraction incompatibility and the microfracture resistance of the particle/matrix interface. The toughening becomes noticeable with a narrow size distribution of appropriately sized particles, and researchers typically accept that deflection effects in materials with roughly equiaxial grains may increase the fracture toughness by about twice the grain boundary value.

The model reveals that the increase in toughness is dependent on particle shape and the volume fraction of the second phase, with the most effective morphology being the rod of high aspect ratio, which can account for a fourfold increase in fracture toughness. The toughening arises primarily from the twist of the crack front between particles, as indicated by deflection profiles. Disc-shaped particles and spheres are less effective in toughening. Fracture toughness, regardless of morphology, is determined by the twist of the crack front at its most severe configuration, rather than the initial tilt of the crack front. Only for disc-shaped particles does the initial tilting of the crack front provide significant toughening; however, the twist component still overrides the tilt-derived toughening.

Additional important features of the deflection analysis include the appearance of asymptotic toughening for the three morphologies at volume fractions in excess of 0.2. It is also noted that a significant influence on the toughening by spherical particles is exerted by the interparticle spacing distribution; greater toughening is afforded when spheres are nearly contacting such that twist angles approach 90 degrees. These predictions provide the basis for the design of high-toughness two-phase ceramic materials.

The ideal second phase, in addition to maintaining chemical compatibility, should be present in amounts of 10 to 20 volume percent. Greater amounts may diminish the toughness increase due to overlapping particles. Particles with high aspect ratios, especially those with rod-shaped morphologies, are most suitable for maximum toughening. This model is often used to determine the factors that contribute to the increase in fracture toughness in ceramics which is ultimately useful in the development of advanced ceramic materials with improved performance.

== Microstructural uniformity ==
In the processing of fine ceramics, the irregular particle sizes and shapes in a typical powder often lead to non-uniform packing morphologies that result in packing density variations in the powder compact. Uncontrolled agglomeration of powders due to attractive van der Waals forces can also give rise to in microstructural inhomogeneities.

Differential stresses that develop as a result of non-uniform drying shrinkage are directly related to the rate at which the solvent can be removed, and thus highly dependent upon the distribution of porosity. Such stresses have been associated with a plastic-to-brittle transition in consolidated bodies, and can yield to crack propagation in the unfired body if not relieved.

In addition, any fluctuations in packing density in the compact as it is prepared for the kiln are often amplified during the sintering process, yielding inhomogeneous densification. Some pores and other structural defects associated with density variations have been shown to play a detrimental role in the sintering process by growing and thus limiting end-point densities. Differential stresses arising from inhomogeneous densification have also been shown to result in the propagation of internal cracks, thus becoming the strength-controlling flaws.

It is therefore desirable to process a material in such a way that it is physically uniform with regard to the distribution of components and porosity, rather than using particle size distributions which will maximize the green density. The containment of a uniformly dispersed assembly of strongly interacting particles in suspension requires total control over particle-particle interactions. Monodisperse colloids provide this potential.

Monodisperse powders of colloidal silica, for example, may therefore be stabilized sufficiently to ensure a high degree of order in the colloidal crystal or polycrystalline colloidal solid which results from aggregation. The degree of order appears to be limited by the time and space allowed for longer-range correlations to be established.

Such defective polycrystalline colloidal structures would appear to be the basic elements of sub-micrometer colloidal materials science, and, therefore, provide the first step in developing a more rigorous understanding of the mechanisms involved in microstructural evolution in inorganic systems such as polycrystalline ceramics.

== Ceramic composites ==
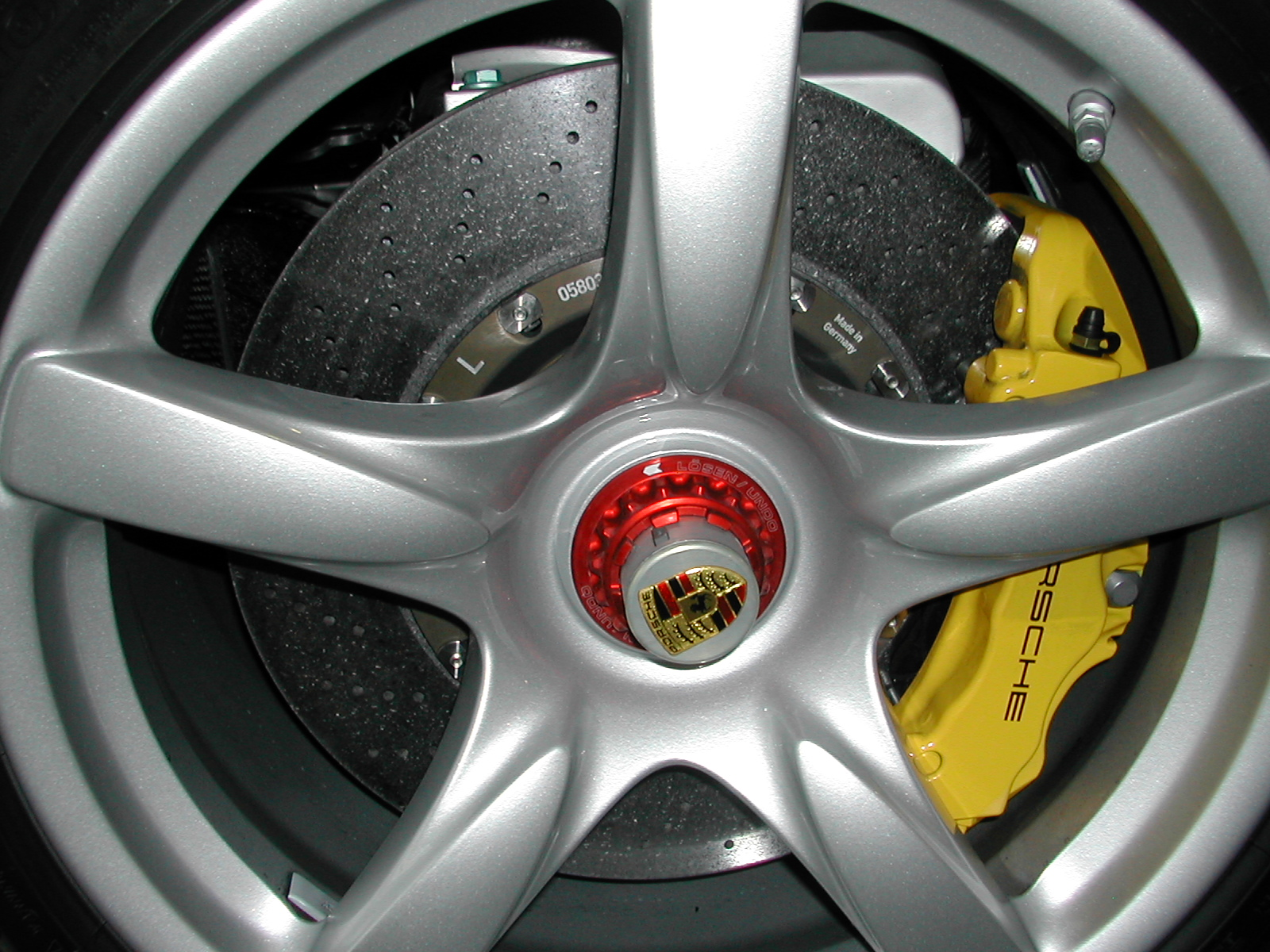
The Porsche Carrera GT's carbon-ceramic (silicon carbide) composite disc brake

These typically comprise two ceramic constituents: a continuous matrix, and a dispersed phase of ceramic particles, whiskers, or short (chopped) or continuous ceramic fibers. The challenge, as in wet chemical processing, is to obtain a uniform or homogeneous distribution of the dispersed particle or fiber phase.

Consider first the processing of particulate composites. The particulate phase of greatest interest is tetragonal zirconia because of the toughening that can be achieved from the phase transformation from the metastable tetragonal to the monoclinic crystalline phase, aka transformation toughening. There is also interest in dispersion of hard, non-oxide phases such as silicon carbide, titanium diboride, titanium carbide, boron, carbon and especially oxide matrices like alumina and mullite. There is also interest too incorporating other ceramic particulates, especially those of highly anisotropic thermal expansion, including aluminum oxide, titanium dioxide, graphite, and boron nitride.

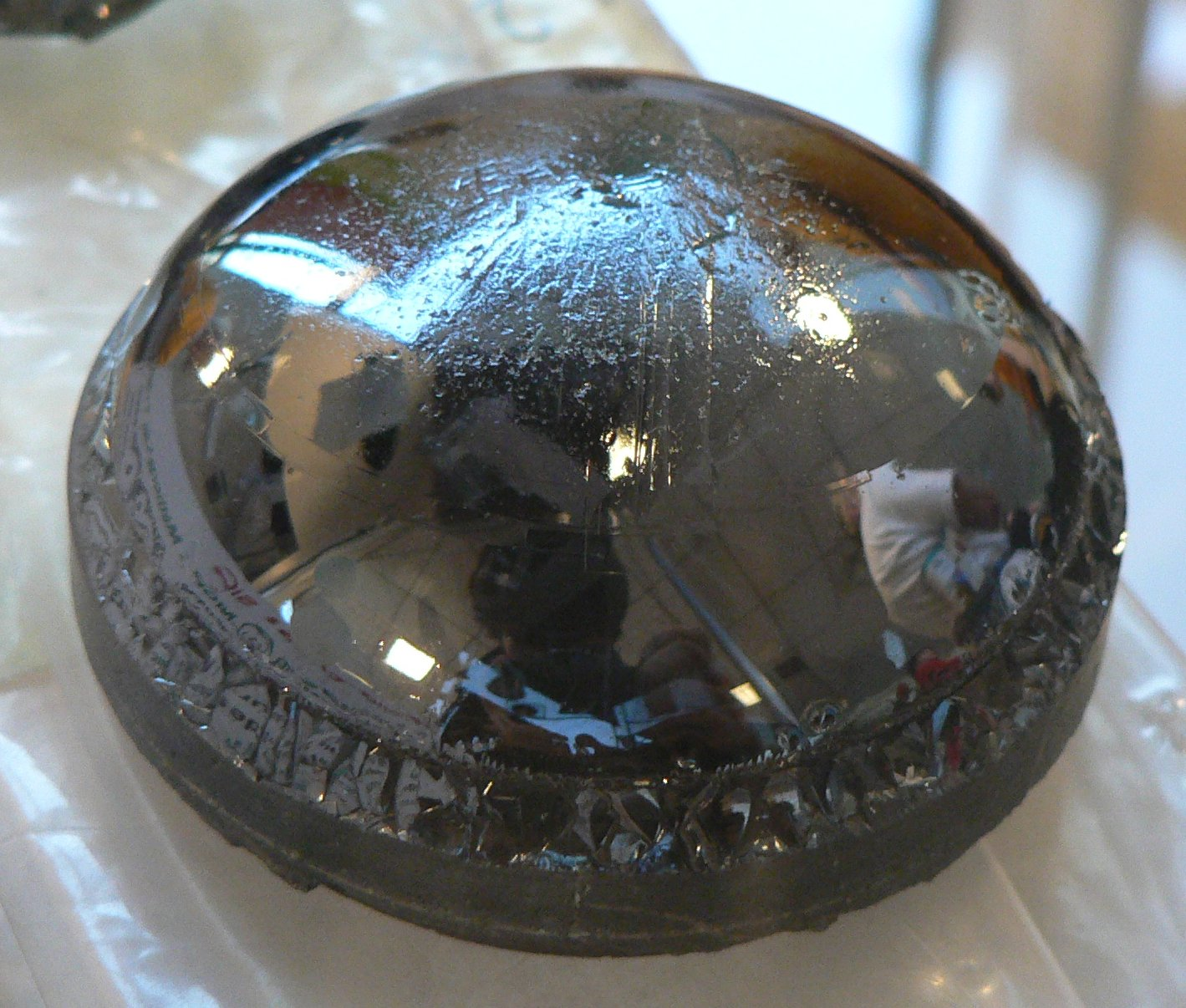
Silicon carbide single crystal

In processing particulate composites, the issue is not only homogeneity of the size and spatial distribution of the dispersed and matrix phases, but also control of the matrix grain size. However, there is some built-in self-control due to inhibition of matrix grain growth by the dispersed phase. Particulate composites, though generally offer increased resistance to damage, failure, or both, are still quite sensitive to inhomogeneities of composition as well as other processing defects such as pores. Thus, they need good processing to be effective.

Particulate composites have been made on a commercial basis by mixing powders of the two constituents. Although this approach is inherently limited in the homogeneity that can be achieved, it is the most readily adaptable for existing ceramic production technology. However, other approaches are of interest.

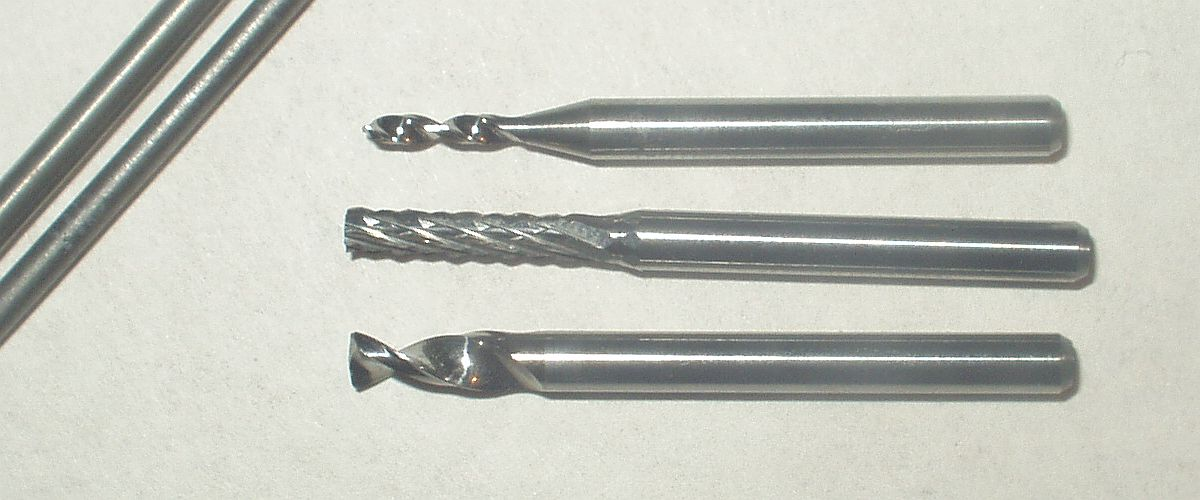
Tungsten carbide milling bits

From the technological standpoint, a desirable approach to fabricating particulate composites is to coat the matrix or its precursor onto fine particles of the dispersed phase with good control of the starting dispersed particle size and the resultant matrix coating thickness. It should, in principle, be possible to achieve perfect homogeneity of distribution and thereby optimize composite performance. This can also have other ramifications, such as allowing more useful composite performance to be achieved in a body having porosity, which might be desired for other factors, such as limiting thermal conductivity.

There are also some opportunities to utilize melt processing for fabrication of ceramic, particulate, whisker and short-fiber, and continuous-fiber composites. Both particulate and whisker composites are conceivable by solid-state precipitation after solidification of the melt. This can also be obtained in some cases by sintering, as for precipitation-toughened, partially stabilized zirconia. Similarly, it is known that one can directionally solidify ceramic eutectic mixtures and hence obtain uniaxially aligned fiber composites. Such composite processing has typically been limited to very simple shapes and thus suffers from serious economic problems due to high machining costs.

There is a possibility for melt casting to be used for many of these approaches. Potentially even more desirable is using melt-derived particles. In this method, quenching is done in a solid solution or in a fine eutectic structure, in which the particles are then processed by more typical ceramic powder processing methods into a useful body. There have also been preliminary attempts to use melt spraying as a means of forming composites by introducing the dispersed particulate, whisker, or fiber phase in conjunction with the melt spraying process.

Other methods besides melt infiltration to manufacture ceramic composites with long fiber reinforcement are chemical vapor infiltration and the infiltration of fiber preforms with organic precursor, which after pyrolysis yield an amorphous ceramic matrix, initially with a low density. With repeated cycles of infiltration and pyrolysis one of those types of ceramic matrix composites is produced. Chemical vapor infiltration is used to manufacture carbon/carbon and silicon carbide reinforced with carbon or silicon carbide fibers.

Besides many process improvements, the first of two major needs for fiber composites is lower fiber costs. The second major need is fiber compositions or coatings, or composite processing, to reduce degradation that results from high-temperature composite exposure under oxidizing conditions.

== Applications ==
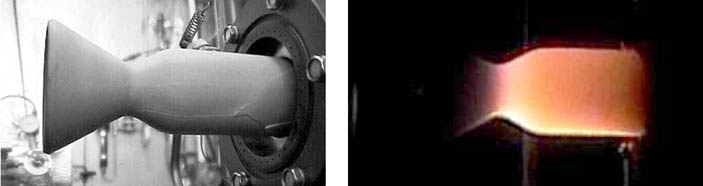
Silicon nitride thruster. Left: Mounted in test stand. Right: Being tested with H_{2}/O_{2} propellants

The products of technical ceramics include tiles used in the Space Shuttle program, gas burner nozzles, ballistic protection, nuclear fuel uranium oxide pellets, bio-medical implants, jet engine turbine blades, and missile nose cones.

Its products are often made from materials other than clay, chosen for their particular physical properties. These may be classified as follows:

- Oxides: silica, alumina, zirconia
- Non-oxides: carbides, borides, nitrides, silicides
- Composites: particulate or whisker reinforced matrices, combinations of oxides and non-oxides (e.g. polymers).

Ceramics can be used in many technological industries. One application is the ceramic tiles on NASA's Space Shuttle, used to protect it and the future supersonic space planes from the searing heat of re-entry into the Earth's atmosphere. They are also used widely in electronics and optics. In addition to the applications listed here, ceramics are also used as a coating in various engineering cases. An example would be a ceramic bearing coating over a titanium frame used for an aircraft. Recently the field has come to include the studies of single crystals or glass fibers, in addition to traditional polycrystalline materials, and the applications of these have been overlapping and changing rapidly.

=== Aerospace ===
Ceramic materials are used in aerospace because of their properties in extreme temperatures and because environmental laws have made using glass fiber and carbon fiber increasingly difficult.

- Engines: shielding a hot running aircraft engine from damaging other components.
- Airframes: used as a high-stress, high-temperature and lightweight bearing and structural component.
- Missile nose-cones: shielding the missile internals from heat.
- Space Shuttle tiles
- Space-debris ballistic shields: ceramic fiber woven shields offer better protection to hypervelocity (~7 km/s) particles than aluminum shields of equal weight.
- Rocket nozzles: focusing high-temperature exhaust gases from the rocket booster.
- Unmanned Air Vehicles: ceramic engine utilization in aeronautical applications (such as Unmanned Air Vehicles) may result in enhanced performance characteristics and less operational costs.
- Ceramic Fabric Wrapping: has been used because of ceramic's sound dampening properties to reduce the acoustic footprint of many UAVs (Unmanned Air Vehicles).
- Ceramic Pressure Sensors: have been used in pressure sensors while in extreme heat and cold environments because of its resistant properties. Other materials typically used for sensors in Aerospace vehicles can produce faulty readings and are susceptible to malfunctions in use.
- Ceramic Ball Bearings: (Si_3 N_4) can be used to withstand the increased heat that comes with greater friction in use. However, detection for ball bearing damage can be difficult for ceramic-silicon hybrid bearings. Damage is detected by the amount of metal fragments in oil after passing through the bearing and is based on metal conductivity (which ceramic does not share).
- Ceramic Engines: while ceramic does have the drawback of being more brittle, it needs less repairs than usual engines. Ceramic engines have become more popular in UAVs because they are less harmful for the environment in use and in production of engine parts.

=== Biomedical ===
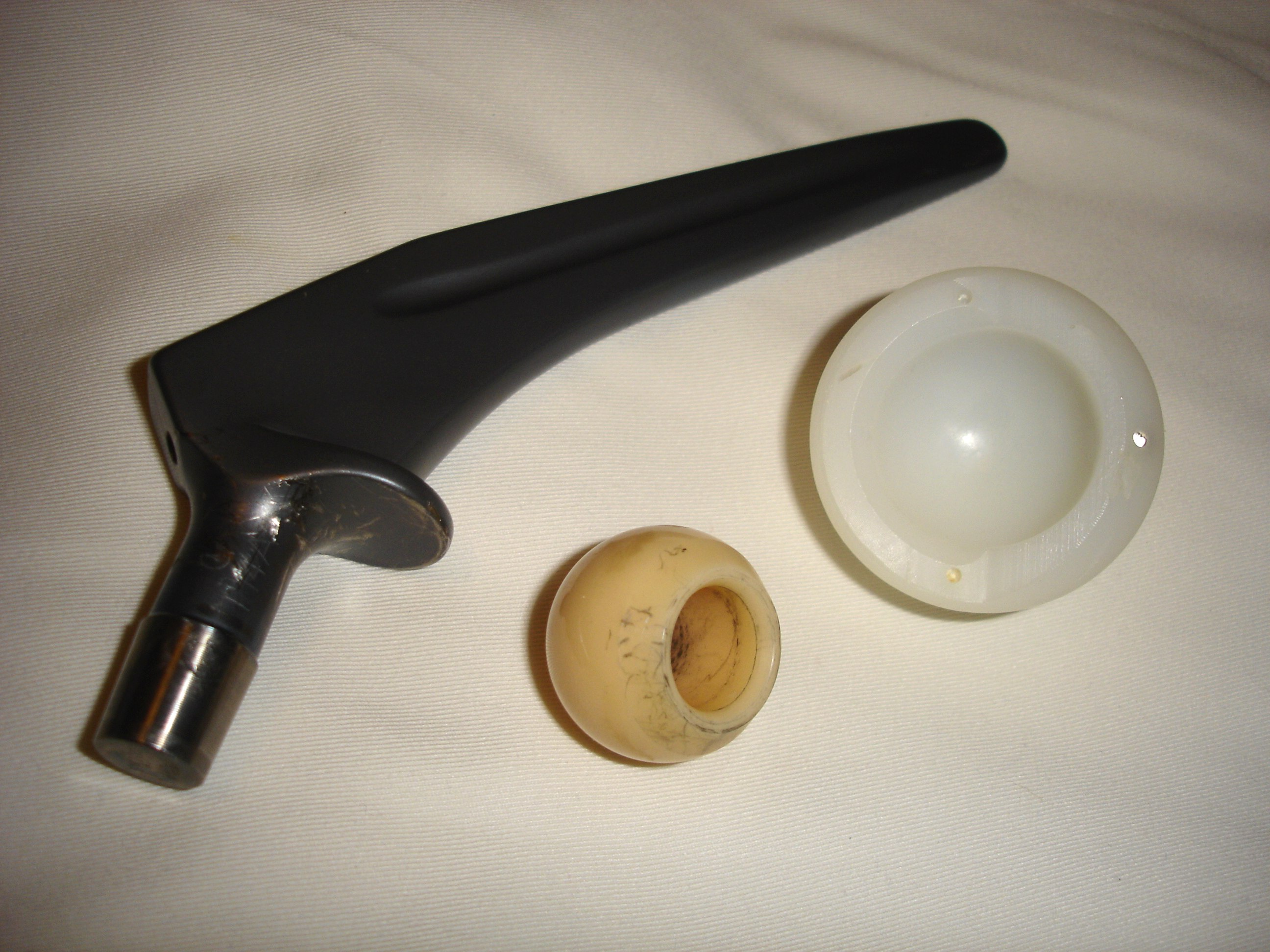
A titanium hip prosthesis, with a ceramic head and polyethylene acetabular cup.

Ceramic structures in biomedical applications have been preferred due to their non-metal properties and their mechanical strength which is necessary for many weight bearing implementations in critical locations. However, manufacturing of ceramic parts must be exact in order to reduce wear of prosthetic parts over long periods of use.

- Artificial bone: While all tissues do recover in due time, hard tissue like bone can take an extensive time to self-repair. Through bone grafting, a porous ceramic sample (CO3Ap) acts as a bone graft to encourage healthy bone repair. An interconnected porous ceramic structure is ideal for encouraging nutrient exchange, cell migration, fluid flow, and vascularization. But these structures do come with less mechanical strength due to their porosity and are difficult to produce.
- Dentistry applications: Dental implants and fillings use ceramic materials due to their similar properties to bone and their mechanical strength. Ceramic implants are more durable in maximizing stiffness and withstanding mastication loads (chewing force).
- Biodegradable splints: Reinforcing bones recovering from osteoporosis and HIV–positive patients with a diagnosis of osteonecrosis. There is currently no cure for HIV and other immunological disorders which creates increasing chronic conditions that can only be treated. Many cases of Osteonecrosis of the femoral head have led to ceramic replacements of both joints.
- Portable oxygen supply: Via the use of ceramic membranes and the power source from a battery, using two Joule heated ceramic membranes, the oxygen pump can deliver concentrated oxygen to mobile patients. This portable device does not require constant heating and can deliver constant 20 ml cm−2 min−1 oxygen in non-extreme conditions.
- Implant material

=== Automotive ===
Automotive uses of ceramics are used for optimization of mechanical structures within automotive engines and are used for their insulating and are resistant to the rapid combustions occurring in engines.

- Turbocharger: made of silicon nitride. Lag is significantly reduced in silicon nitride turbochargers because they are lighter than the traditional Ni-based superalloys. Also, the time taken to reach 10,000 rpm is 36% shorter for the ceramic rotor which can lead to its preference over traditional Ni-based turbochargers.
- Exhaust heat management: an efficient engine has a relatively high thermal efficiency to ensure fuel is being used efficiently. Earlier car engines started using ceramic gas turbine engines, however there were challenges with thermal deformation, insufficient lubricating of rotating parts, and low strength of ceramic materials at high temperatures.
- Heat shield
- Exhaust heat management

=== Electronics ===
- Capacitors
- Integrated circuit packages
- Transducers
- Insulators

=== Optical ===
- Optical fibers, guided light wave transmission
- Switches
- Laser amplifiers
- Lenses
- Infrared heat-seeking devices

== Biomaterials ==
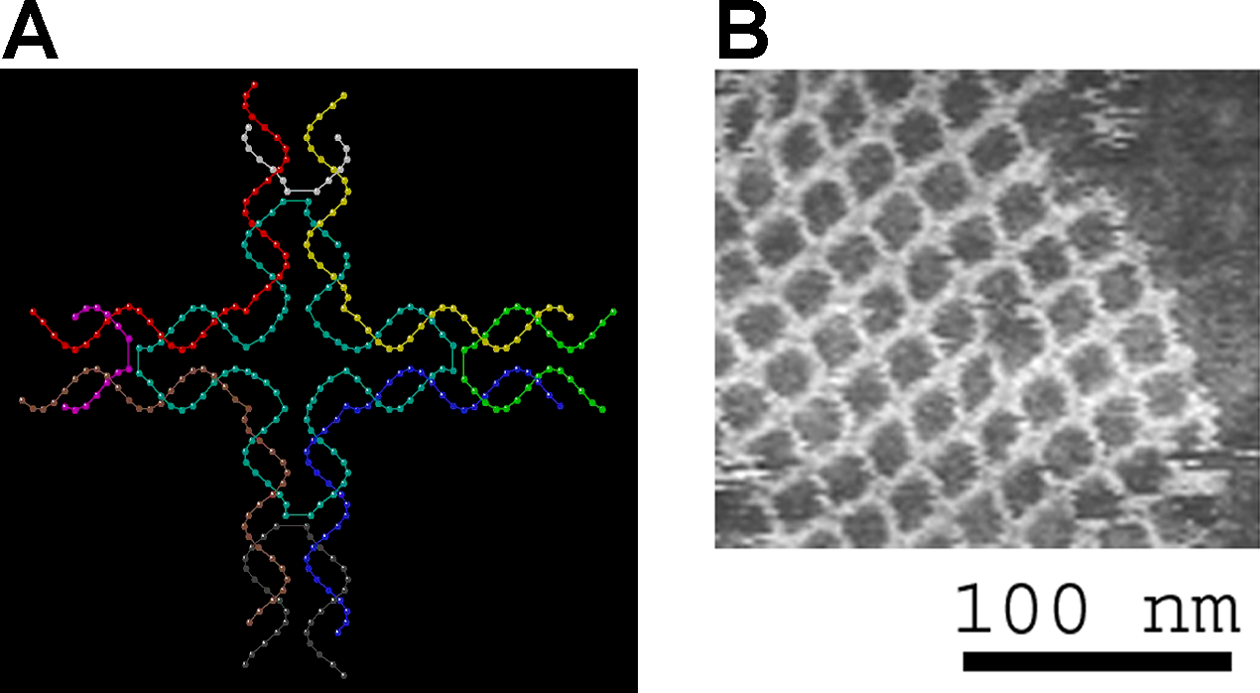
The DNA structure at left (schematic shown) will self-assemble into the structure visualized by atomic force microscopy at right.

Silicification is quite common in the biological world and occurs in bacteria, single-celled organisms, plants, and animals (invertebrates and vertebrates). Crystalline minerals formed in such environment often show exceptional physical properties (e.g. strength, hardness, fracture toughness) and tend to form hierarchical structures that exhibit microstructural order over a range of length or spatial scales. The minerals are crystallized from an environment that is undersaturated with respect to silicon, and under conditions of neutral pH and low temperature (0–40 °C). Formation of the mineral may occur either within or outside of the cell wall of an organism, and specific biochemical reactions for mineral deposition exist that include lipids, proteins and carbohydrates.

Most natural (or biological) materials are complex composites whose mechanical properties are often outstanding, considering the weak constituents from which they are assembled. These complex structures, which have risen from hundreds of million years of evolution, are inspiring the design of novel materials with exceptional physical properties for high performance in adverse conditions. Their defining characteristics such as hierarchy, multifunctionality, and the capacity for self-healing, are currently being investigated.

The basic building blocks begin with the 20 amino acids and proceed to polypeptides, polysaccharides, and polypeptides–saccharides. These, in turn, compose the basic proteins, which are the primary constituents of the 'soft tissues' common to most biominerals. With well over 1,000 proteins possible, current research emphasizes the use of collagen, chitin, keratin, and elastin. The 'hard' phases are often strengthened by crystalline minerals, which nucleate and grow in a bio-mediated environment that determines the size, shape and distribution of individual crystals. The most important mineral phases have been identified as hydroxyapatite, silica, and aragonite. Using the classification of Wegst and Ashby, the principal mechanical characteristics and structures of biological ceramics, polymer composites, elastomers, and cellular materials have been presented. Selected systems in each class are being investigated with emphasis on the relationship between their microstructure over a range of length scales and their mechanical response.

Thus, the crystallization of inorganic materials in nature generally occurs at ambient temperature and pressure. Yet the vital organisms through which these minerals form are capable of consistently producing extremely precise and complex structures. Understanding the processes in which living organisms control the growth of crystalline minerals such as silica could lead to significant advances in the field of materials science.

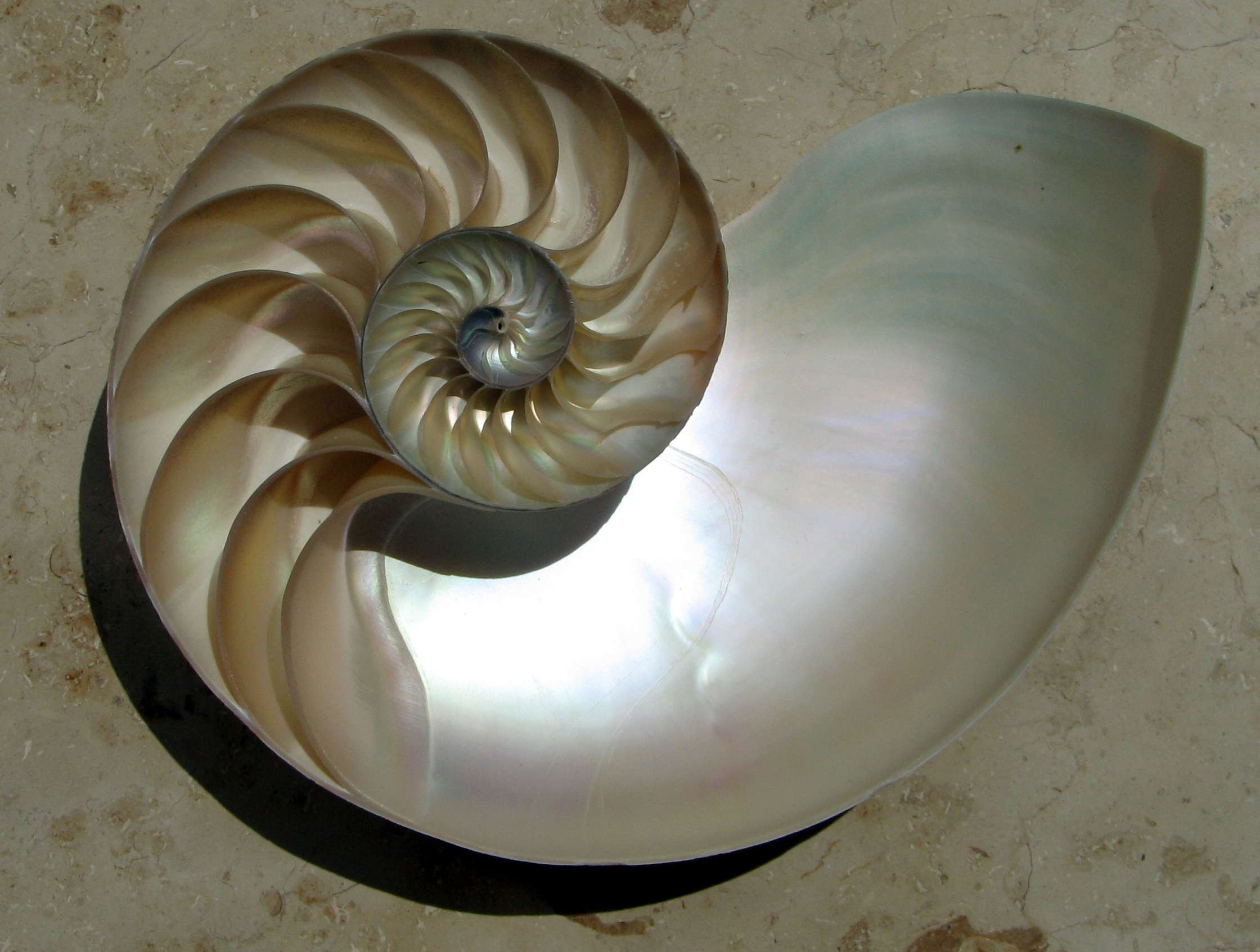
The iridescent nacre inside a Nautilus shell.

The mother-of-pearl (or nacre) portion of the abalone shell exhibits the highest mechanical strength and fracture toughness of any non-metallic substance known. The nacre from the shell of the abalone has become one of the more intensively studied biological structures in materials science. Clearly visible in these images are the neatly stacked (or ordered) mineral tiles separated by thin organic sheets along with a macrostructure of larger periodic growth bands which collectively form what scientists are currently referring to as a hierarchical composite structure. (The term hierarchy simply implies that there are a range of structural features which exist over a wide range of length scales).

Future developments reside in the synthesis of bio-inspired materials through processing methods and strategies that are characteristic of biological systems. These involve nanoscale self-assembly of the components and the development of hierarchical structures.

== See also ==
- Ceramic matrix composite – Composite material consisting of ceramic fibers in a ceramic matrix
- Chemical engineering – Engineering discipline focused on the design and operation of chemical plants
- Colloid – Mixture of an insoluble substance microscopically dispersed throughout another substance
- Glass-ceramic-to-metal seals – Airtight seal between glass-ceramic and metal surfaces
- Materials science – Research of materials
- Mechanical engineering – Engineering discipline
- Nanoparticle – Particle with size less than 100 nm
- Photonic crystal – Periodic optical nanostructure that affects the motion of photons
- Quenching – Rapid cooling of a workpiece to obtain certain material properties
- Three-point flexural test – Standard procedure for measuring modulus of elasticity in bending
- Transparent materials – Physical property of allowing light
- Yttria-stabilized zirconia – Ceramic with room temperature stable cubic crystal structure
