= Gelcasting =

Gel casting is a direct foaming technique used to produce ceramic and polymeric scaffolds.

== History ==
Gel casting was developed in Canada in the 1960s. This technique has since become a reliable forming process for the manufacturing of near-net-shape, very large, high-quality, complex ceramic parts with specified threshold strength.

== Process ==
In this technique, the precursor materials typically consist of a monomer, cross linker, free radical initiator or catalysts placed into an aqueous suspension. Such precursor conforms to a slurry that is then foamed before it undergoes a direct consolidation step. In this step, the binder becomes polymerized to consolidate the particle structure within the precursor slurry. The process then forms a gel type of mixture, which is then cast into a proper mould. The next step, after the gel solidification, it is removed from the mould in a controlled manner and then being dried to form a green body. The outcome here has interesting mechanical properties and is capable of being machined at this step. Eventually, the binder is burnt out and the final scaffold sintering will take place.

== See also ==
- Freeze gelation
- Colloidal crystal
