= Ceramic forming techniques =

Ceramic forming techniques are ways of forming ceramics, which are used to make everything from tableware such as teapots to engineering ceramics such as computer parts. Pottery techniques include the potter's wheel, slip casting and many others.

Methods for forming powders of ceramic raw materials into complex shapes are desirable in many areas of technology. For example, such methods are required for producing advanced, high-temperature structural parts such as heat engine components, recuperators and the like from powders of ceramic raw materials.

== Slip casting ==
There are many forming techniques to make ceramics, but one example is slip casting. This is where slip or, liquid clay, is poured into a plaster mould. The water in the slip is drawn out into the walls of the plaster mould, leaving an inside layer of solid clay, which hardens quickly. When dry, the solid clay can then also be removed. The slip used in slip casting is often liquified with a substance that reduces the need for additional water to soften the slip (unless crazing is wanted); this prevents excessive shrinkage which occurs when a piece containing a lot of water dries; another approach is to dry items slowly.

Slip-casting methods provide superior surface quality, density and uniformity in casting high-purity ceramic raw materials over other ceramic casting techniques, such as hydraulic casting, since the cast part is a higher concentration of ceramic raw materials with little additives. A slip is a suspension of fine raw materials powder in a liquid such as water or alcohol with small amounts of secondary materials such as dispersants, surfactants and binders. Pottery slip casting techniques employ a plaster block or flask mould. The plaster mould draws water from the poured slip to compact and form the casting at the mould surface. This forms a dense cast removing deleterious air gaps and minimizing shrinkage in the final sintering process.

== Additive manufacturing ==
See also Selective laser sintering.

For the production of complex shapes in small quantities, additive manufacturing (AM) represents an effective approach, and is the subject of significant research and development. Unlike the additive manufacturing of polymeric materials, the scope of AM of ceramics remains quite limited owing to materials processing challenges. Commercially available equipment for the AM of ceramics mostly relies on layer by layer sintering of powders and is rarely cost-effective. However, the difficulties in machining ceramic articles means that AM techniques can be attractive in situations where production volumes are too low to viably produce molds for slip casting methods. In particular the additive manufacturing of ceramics from preceramic polymers using techniques including stereolithography, with subsequent pyrolysis to yield polymer derived ceramics, represents an emerging approach to tackling the challenge of additively manufactured ceramics.

== Ceramic shell casting ==
Ceramic shell casting techniques using silica, zirconia and other refractory materials are currently used by the metal parts industry for 'net casting', forming precision shell moulds for molten metal casting. The technique involves a successive wet dipping and dry powder coating or stucco to build up the mould shell layer. The shell casting method in general is known for dimensional stability and is used in many net-casting processes for aerospace and other industries in molten metal casting. Automated facilities use multiple wax patterns on trees, large slurry mixers and fluidic powder beds for automated dipping.

== Technical ceramics ==
When forming technical ceramic materials from dry powders prepared for processing, the method of forming into the shape required depends upon the method of material preparation and size and shape of the part to be formed. Materials prepared for dry powder forming are most commonly formed by "dry" pressing in mechanical or hydraulic powder compacting presses selected for the necessary force and powder fill depth. Dry powder is automatically discharged into the non-flexible steel or tungsten carbide insert in the die and punches then compact the powder to the shape of the die. If the part is to be large and unable to have pressure transmit suitably for a uniform pressed density then isostatic pressing may be used. When isostatically pressed the powder takes the shape of a flexible membrane acting as the mould, forming the shape and size of the pressed powder. Isostatic presses can be either high speed, high output type of automatic presses for such parts as ceramic insulators for spark plugs or sand blast nozzles, or slower operating "wet bag" presses that are much more manual in operation but suitable particularly for large machinable blanks or blanks that will be cut or otherwise formed in secondary operations to the final shape.

If technical ceramic parts are needed where the length to diameter ratio is very large, extrusion may be used. There are two types of ceramic extruders one being piston type with hydraulic force pushing a ram that in turn is pushing the ceramic through the loaded material cylinder to and through the die which forms the extrudate. The second type of extruder is a screw, or auger, type where a screw turns forcing the material to and through the die which again shapes the part. In both types of extrusion the raw material must be plasticized to allow and induce the flow of the material in the process.

Complex technical ceramic parts are commonly formed using either the injection moulding process or "hot wax moulding." Both rely on heat sensitive plasticizers to allow material flow into a die. The part is then quickly cooled for removal from the die. Ceramic injection moulding is much like plastic injection moulding using various polymers for plasticizing. Hot wax moulding largely uses paraffin wax.

== Other techniques ==
There are also several traditional techniques of handbuilding, such as pinching, soft slab, hard slab, and coil construction.

Other techniques involve threading animal or artificial wool fiber through paperclay slip, to build up layers of material. The result can be wrapped over forms or cut, dried and later joined with liquid and soft paperclay.

When forming very thin sheets of ceramic material, "tape casting" is commonly used. This involves pouring the slip (which contains a polymer "binder" to give it strength) onto a moving carrier belt, and then passing it under a stationary "doctor blade" to adjust the thickness. The moving slip is then air dried, and the "tape" thus formed is peeled off the carrier belt, cut into rectangular shapes, and processed further. As many as 100 tape layers, alternating with conductive metal powder layers, can be stacked up. These are then sintered ("fired") to remove the polymer and thus make "multilayer" capacitors, sensors, etc. According to D. W. Richerson of the American Ceramic Society, more than a billion of such capacitors are manufactured every day. (About 100 are in a typical cellular telephone, and about a thousand in a typical automobile.)

Gel casting is another technique used to create engineering ceramics.

== See also ==
- Ceramic mold casting
- Chalkware
