= Slip casting =

Technique for forming pottery

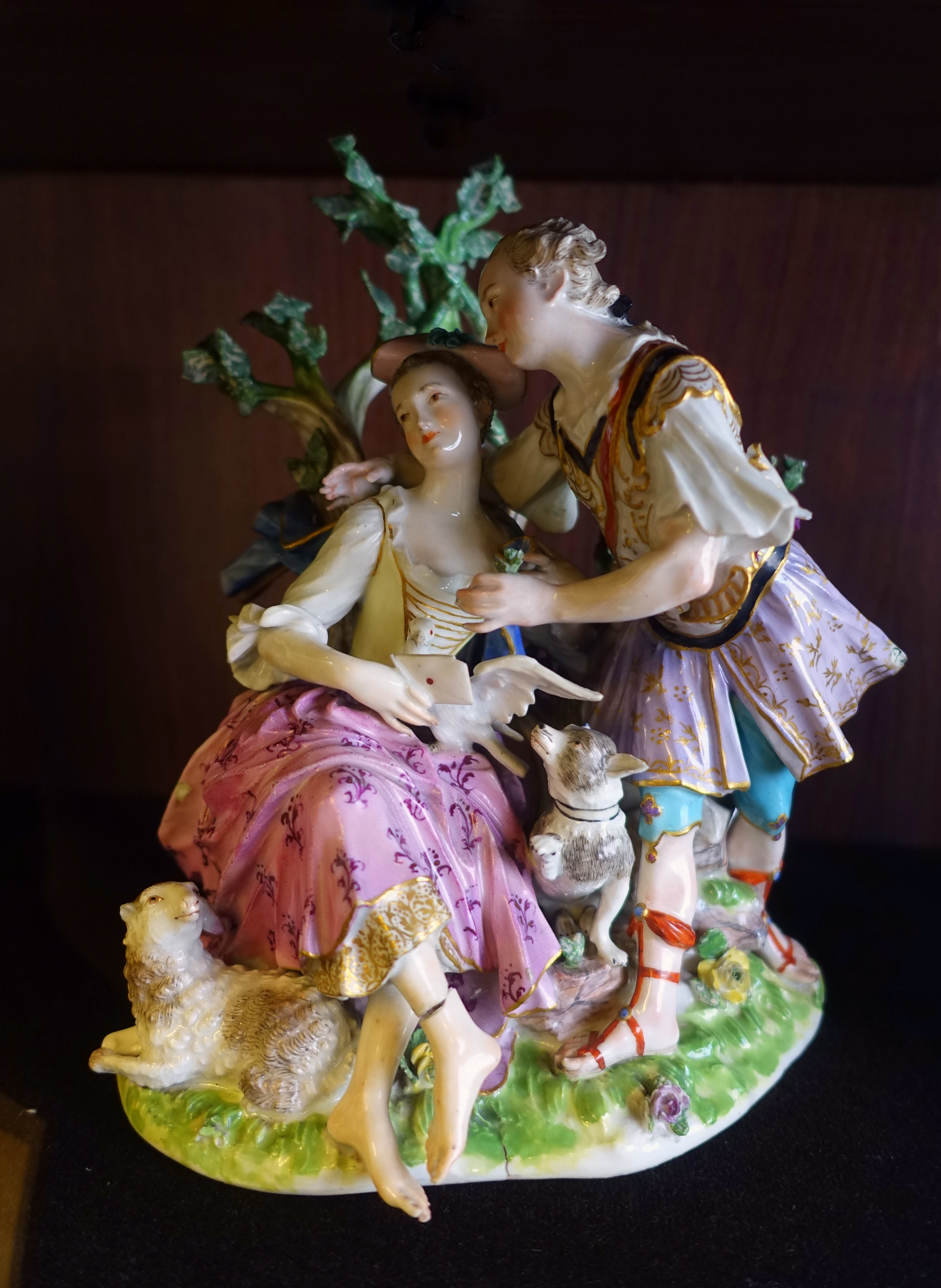
Porcelain figurine which had been formed by slipcasting

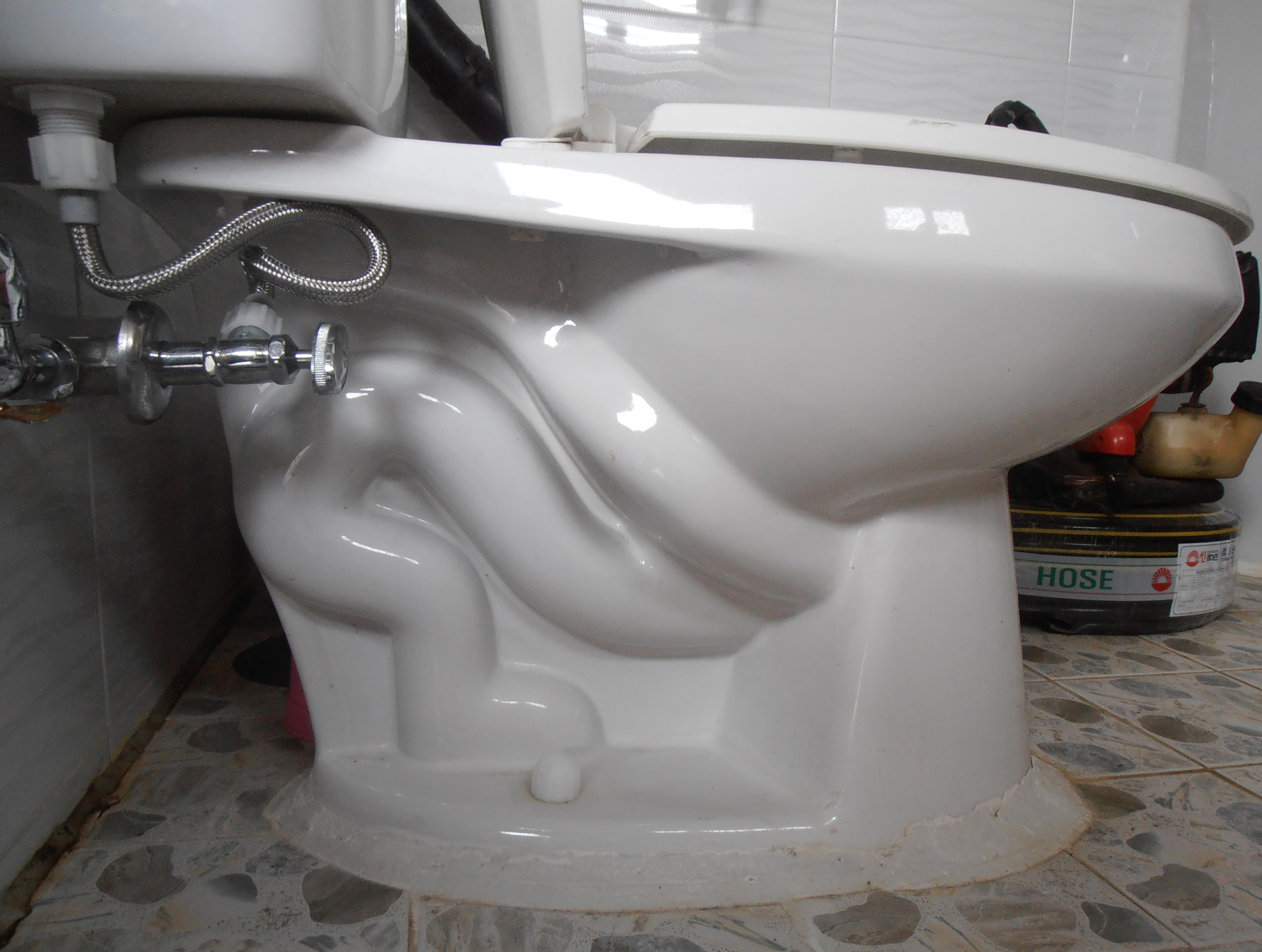
Slipcasting allows the shaping of complex shapes, such as this toilet bowl

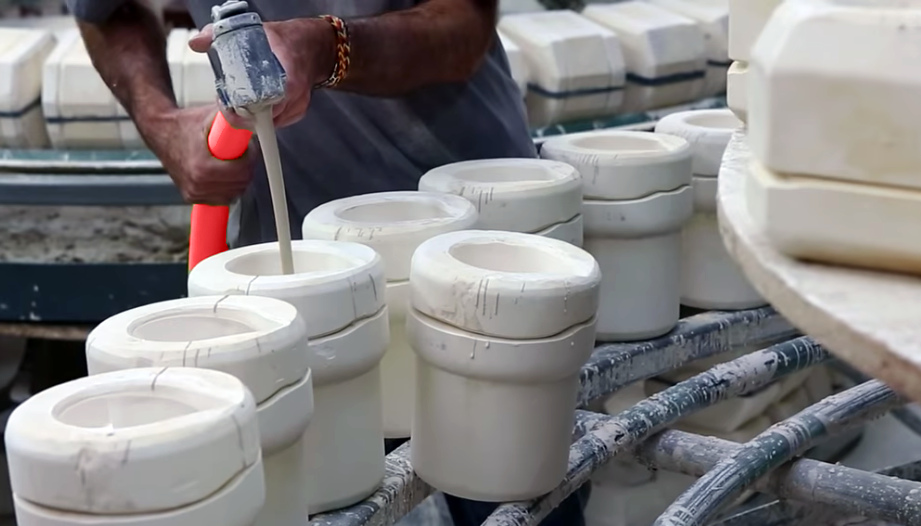
Pouring casting slip into a mould

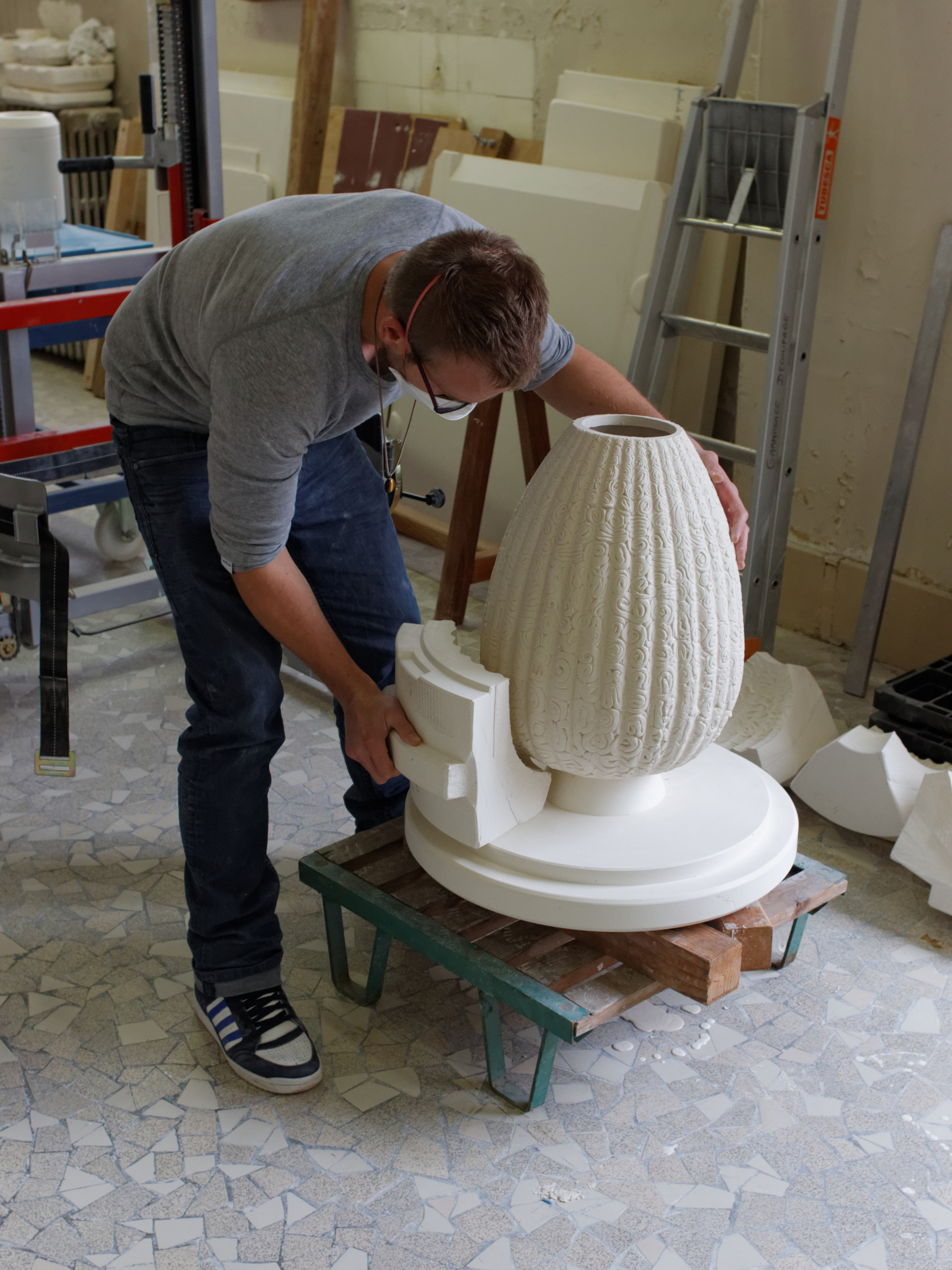
Removing the last parts of a mould from a slipcast vase

Slip casting, or slipcasting, is a ceramic forming technique, and is widely used in industry and by craft potters to make ceramic forms. This technique is typically used to form complicated shapes like figurative ceramics that would be difficult to be reproduced by hand or other forming techniques. The technique involves a clay body slip, usually prepared in a blunger, being poured into plaster moulds and allowed to form a layer, the cast, on the internal walls of the mould.

It is suited for the consistent and precise shaping of complex shapes. It is the standard shaping technique for sanitaryware, such as toilets and basins, and is commonly used for smaller pieces like figurines and teapots.

== History ==
The technique was first developed in China during the Tang dynasty (618–917), but was relatively little-used in China until recent times. It seems to have been reinvented independently in England around 1745 "reputedly" by Ralph Daniel of Cobridge, and before long was widely used by European porcelain manufacturers, and then became the main forming technique for sanitaryware by the end of the century.

== Technical considerations ==
Solid casting is used to produce solid articles, such as cup handles; for this the mold frequently includes a reservoir of excess slip. Hollow casting is used to produce articles such as teapots.

The properties of a casting slip depends on multiple factors, including:

- the properties of each raw material in the slip,
- the solids content of the slip,
- the clay:non-plastic ratio in the slip,
- the chemicals in the slip, either deliberately added or introduced from the raw materials and water,
- the type and amount of deflocculant,
- the ambient conditions, especially temperature and humidity, and
- the amount of energy involved in mixing the raw materials to prepare the slip.

Additionally, factors affecting the rate of formation of the cast piece include:

- the viscosity and thixotropy of the slip, which are invariably modified immediately before casting,
- properties of the mold material, such as permeability, and
- moisture content of the mould.

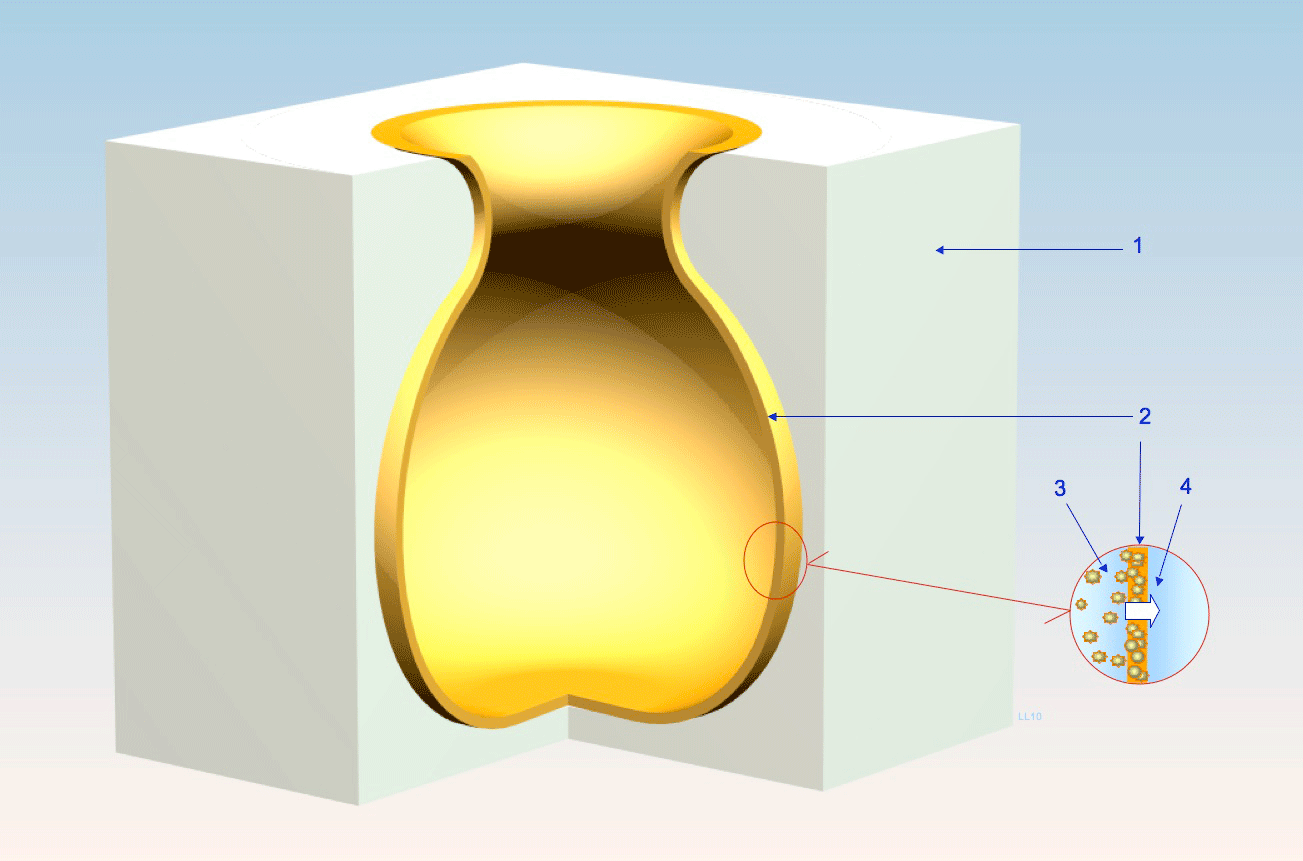
Schematic of the formation of a cast piece

The casting slip is poured into a porous mould. Due to capillary pressure from the mold, a semi-solid particulate layer is formed on the mould through deposition of the solids in the slip. After a period of time, determined in advance by testing, the cast piece is removed from the mold; the cast needs to be sufficiently firm to handle without damage. The cast piece may then be fettled to remove the mold seam, before being dried to remove the remaining water. This typically results in a greenware piece which is then ready for subsequent processing, including glazing and firing.

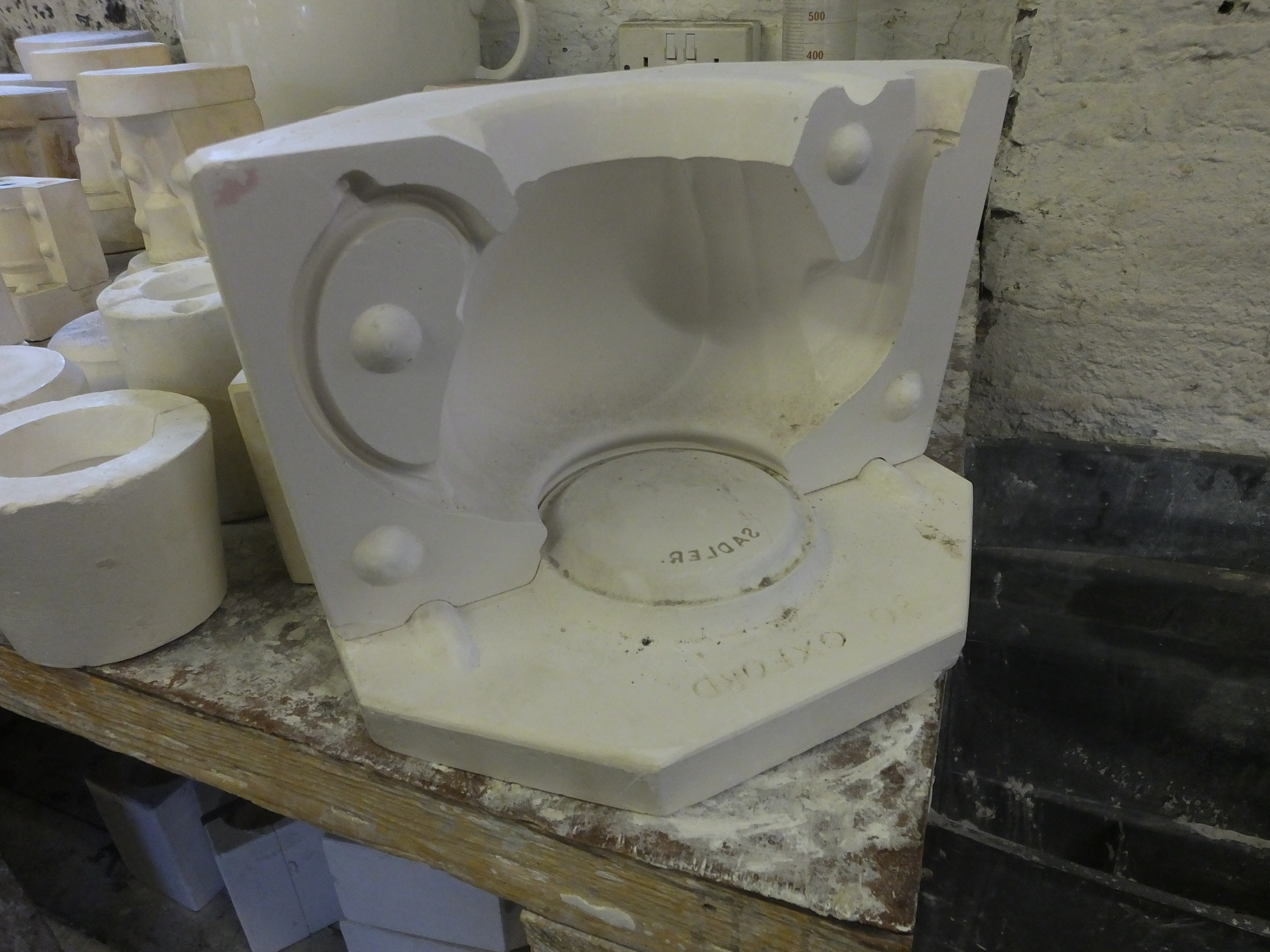
Part of a mould for a teapot

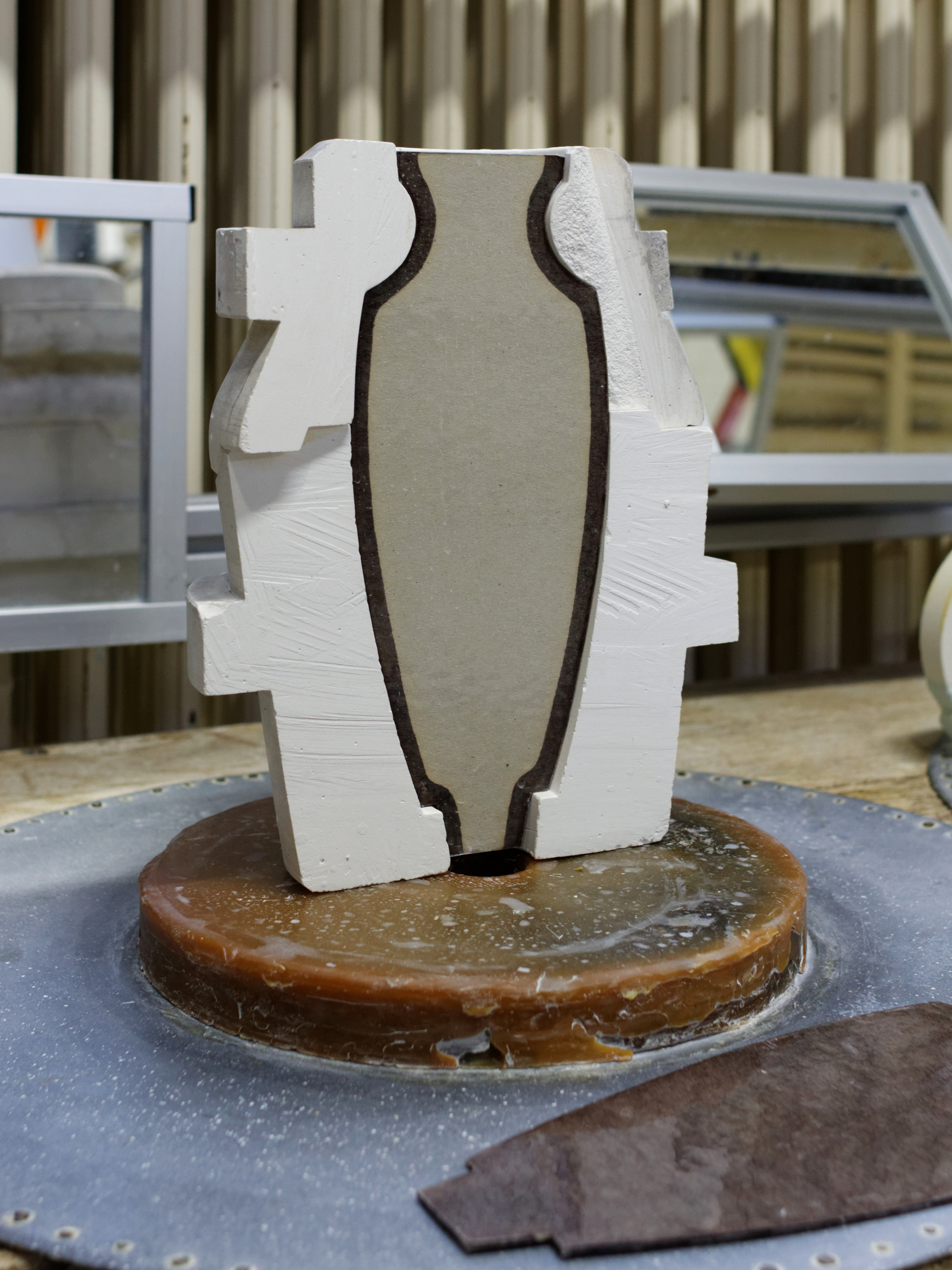
Half a mould showing half of a solid cast piece

=== Casting times ===
A lavatory closet typically takes around 40 to 60 minutes to cast using the conventional technique, with a Swiss manufacturer noting that "preparing the mould and casting a single piece can take up to 40 minutes." Thinner sections will be quicker, with one source advising 5–10 mm taking 10–15 minutes.

Casting times for ceramic tableware have been reported as 35 to 60 minutes for earthenware and 8 to 20 minutes for bone china. Other reports include: 30–50 minutes at a US studio pottery; around 60 minutes at a small Portuguese manufacturer of decorative ceramics; "approximately 15 minutes" from a US distance learning university; 15–20 minutes in an article for studio potters; and 15–45 minutes in a guide for beginners.

Casting times are notably shorter by pressure casting, with 2 minutes reported for tableware bowls and dishes, and 6–8 minutes for sanitaryware. The cycle time per piece of sanitaryware using high pressure at Duravit is reported to be 20 minutes.

=== Solids content of the slip ===
To achieve an acceptable rate of cast formation and minimize drying shrinkage, a slip with a high content of solids is needed. The generally accepted solids content of a Vitreous China sanitaryware casting slip ranges between 72 and 75% by weight, which corresponds to slip densities of 1.80–1.85 g/cm^{3}.

Certain chemicals, known as deflocculants, are used to disperse agglomerates in the slip, and so decrease the viscosity and also allow a higher solids content; the latter is important to minimize drying shrinkage. Examples of deflocculants include sodium carbonate and sodium silicate. Typical deflocculant additions used for a Vitreous China casting slip are 0.1-0.65%; the rheological properties of the clay components are the main influencing factors for the dosage.

A mathematical formula developed by Alexandre Brongniart of Sèvres Porcelain is used to determine the dry material content of the slip. This has become to be known as Brongniart's formula.

== Pressure casting ==
Pressure casting is a development of traditional slipcasting which was developed in the 1970s for the production of sanitaryware and more recently has been applied to tableware.

Specially developed polymeric materials allow a mold to be subject to application of external pressures up to 4.0 MPa; much higher than slip casting in plaster molds where the capillary forces correspond to a pressure of around 0.1–0.2 MPa. The high pressure leads to much faster casting rates and, hence, faster production cycles: one study found that by increasing the pressure from 0.25 to 4.0 bar (3.6 to 58 psi) decreased the casting time for a 6-mm cast of a porcelain body from about 45 to 15 min. Using pressure casting, a Geberit factory in Finland casts a toilet in 20 minutes.

Furthermore, the application of high-pressure air through the polymeric molds upon demolding the cast means that a new casting cycle can be started immediately in the same mold, unlike plaster moulds which require lengthy drying times. The polymeric materials have much greater durability than plaster and, therefore, it is possible to achieve products with better dimensional tolerances and much longer mold life.

Advantages of pressure casting over conventional casting have been summarized as higher productivity, higher yield, improved ware quality, lower distortion of the cast piece, reduced surface defects, reduced production space, reduced demand for molds, reduced energy costs, and readily fitting with the automation of demolding and handling.

== Ceramic laminates ==
As a processing technique for ceramic laminates, a ceramic powder is often placed in suspension to form a slip with a high solids content (>60 wt%) as well as a very low viscosity value (<40 mPa). A series of layers can be formed by changing the composition of the slips used in repeated castings. If the chemistry of the materials being used is well understood, the thickness of the layers can be controlled by varying the length of time involved in the casting.

== Slipware ==
Slip-cast ware, objects that are formed using slip casting, should not be confused with slipware, pottery that is formed by any technique and then decorated using slip. The French for slip is barbotine (coulée en barbotine means slip casting). As far back as the Roman Empire, potters created what is termed "Barbotine ware" by using clay slip to decorate the surface of pots. "Barbotine pottery" is sometimes used for 19th-century French and American pottery with added slip cast decoration, as well as (confusingly) 17th century English slipware that is decorated with thick blobs of slip.
