= Hot cathode =

Type of electrode

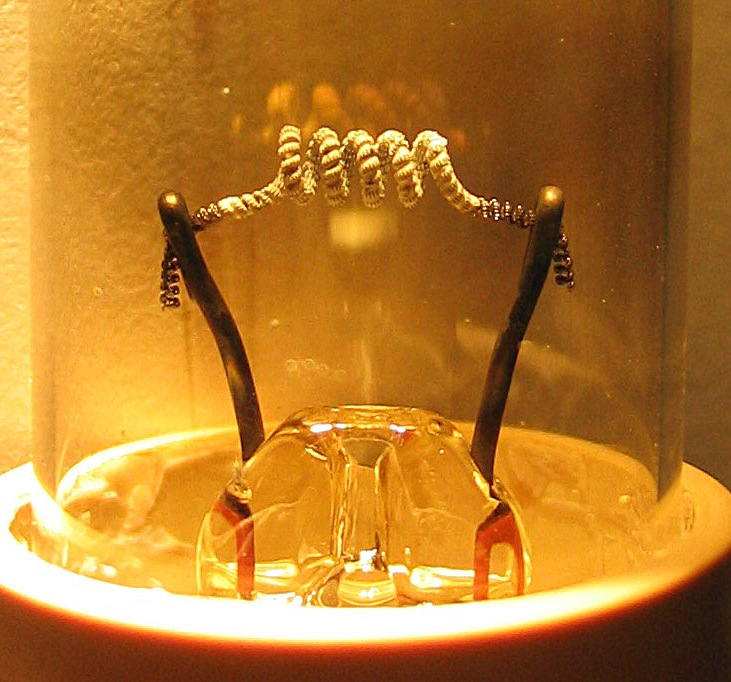
A tungsten filament acting as a directly heated cathode in a low pressure mercury gas discharge lamp which emits electrons. To increase electron emission, a white thermionic emission mix coating is applied on hot cathodes, visible on the central portion of the coil. Typically made of a mixture of barium, strontium, and calcium oxides, the coating is sputtered away through normal use, eventually resulting in lamp failure.

In vacuum tubes and gas-filled tubes, a hot cathode or thermionic cathode is a cathode electrode which is heated to make it emit electrons due to thermionic emission. This is in contrast to a cold cathode, which does not have a heating element. The heating element is usually an electrical filament heated by a separate electric current passing through it. Hot cathodes typically achieve much higher power density than cold cathodes, emitting significantly more electrons from the same surface area. Cold cathodes rely on field electron emission or secondary electron emission from positive ion bombardment, and do not require heating. There are two types of hot cathode. In a directly heated cathode, the filament is the cathode and emits the electrons. In an indirectly heated cathode, the filament or heater heats a separate metal cathode electrode which emits the electrons.

From the 1920s to the 1960s, a wide variety of electronic devices used hot-cathode vacuum tubes. Today, hot cathodes are used as the source of electrons in fluorescent lamps, vacuum tubes, and the electron guns used in cathode ray tubes and laboratory equipment such as electron microscopes.

== Description ==
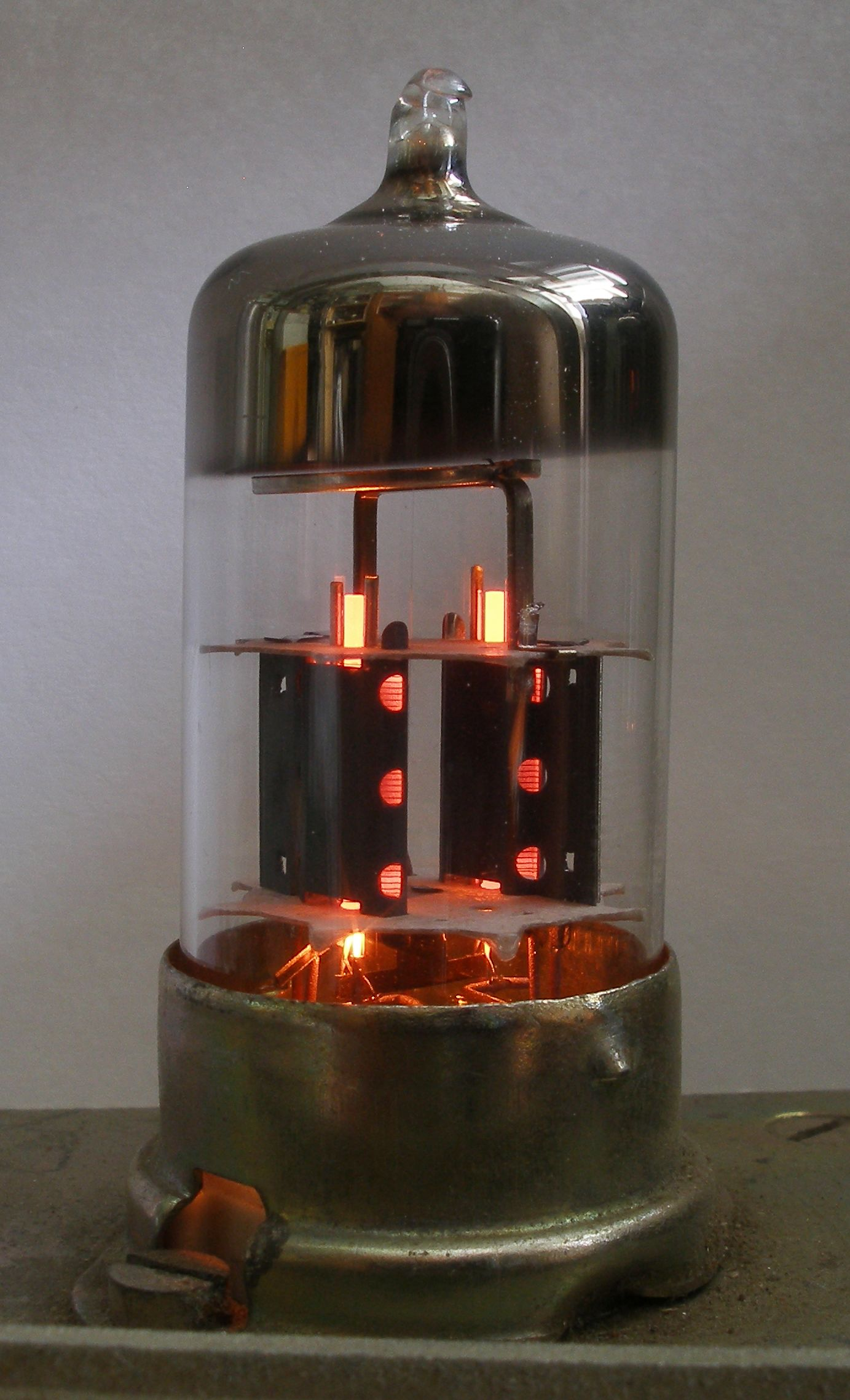
Two indirectly heated cathodes (orange heater strip) in ECC83 dual triode tube

Cutaway view of a triode vacuum tube with an indirectly heated cathode (orange tube), showing the heater element inside

A cathode electrode in a vacuum tube or other vacuum system is a metal surface which emits electrons into the evacuated space of the tube. Since the negatively charged electrons are attracted to the positive nuclei of the metal atoms, they normally stay inside the metal and require energy to leave it. This energy is called the work function of the metal. In a hot cathode, the cathode surface is induced to emit electrons by heating it with a filament, a thin wire of refractory metal like tungsten with current flowing through it. The cathode is heated to a temperature that causes electrons to be 'boiled off' of its surface into the evacuated space in the tube, a process called thermionic emission.

There are two types of hot cathodes:

Directly heated cathode
In this type, the filament itself is the cathode, emits the electrons directly and is coated in metal oxides. Directly heated cathodes were used in the first vacuum tubes. Today, they are used in fluorescent tubes and most high-power transmitting vacuum tubes.
Indirectly heated cathode
In this type, the filament is not the cathode but rather heats a separate cathode consisting of a sheet metal cylinder surrounding the filament, and the cylinder emits electrons. Indirectly heated cathodes are used in most low power vacuum tubes. For example, in most vacuum tubes the cathode is a nickel tube, coated with metal oxides. It is heated by a tungsten filament inside it, and the heat from the filament causes the outside surface of the oxide coating to emit electrons. The filament of an indirectly heated cathode is usually called the heater.

The main reason for using an indirectly heated cathode is to isolate the rest of the vacuum tube from the electric potential across the filament, allowing vacuum tubes to use alternating current to heat the filament. In a tube in which the filament itself is the cathode, the alternating electric field from the filament surface would affect the movement of the electrons and introduce hum into the tube output. It also allows the filaments in all the tubes in an electronic device to be tied together and supplied from the same current source, even though the cathodes they heat may be at different potentials.

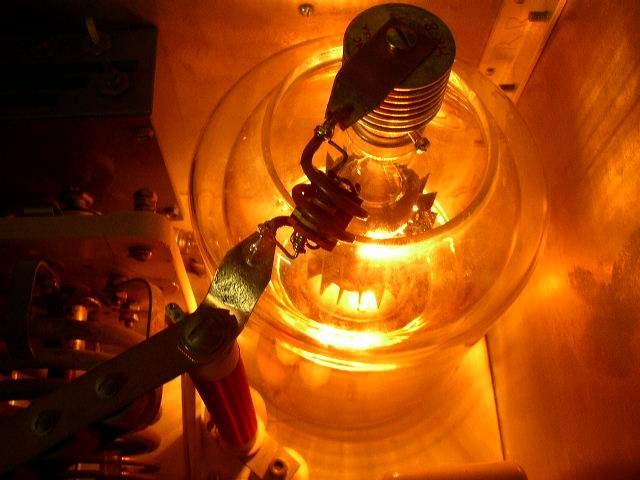
Glow of a directly heated cathode in an Eimac 4-1000A 1 kW power tetrode tube in a radio transmitter. Directly heated cathodes operate at higher temperatures and produce a brighter glow. The cathode is behind the other tube elements and not directly visible.

To improve electron emission, cathodes are usually treated with chemicals, compounds of metals with a low work function. These form a metal layer on the surface which emits more electrons. Treated cathodes require less surface area, lower temperatures and less power to supply the same cathode current. The untreated thoriated tungsten filaments used in early vacuum tubes (called "bright emitters") had to be heated to 2,500 °F (1,370 °C), white-hot, to produce sufficient thermionic emission for use, while modern coated cathodes (called "dull emitters") produce far more electrons at a given temperature, so they only have to be heated to 800–1,100 °F (427–593 °C).

== Types ==
=== Oxide-coated cathodes ===
The most common type of indirectly heated cathode is the oxide-coated cathode, in which the nickel cathode surface has a coating of alkaline earth metal oxide to increase emission. One of the earliest materials used for this was barium oxide; it forms a monatomic layer of barium with an extremely low work function. More modern formulations utilize a mixture of barium oxide, strontium oxide and calcium oxide. Another standard formulation is barium oxide, calcium oxide, and aluminium oxide in a 5:3:2 ratio. Thorium oxide may be used as well. Oxide-coated cathodes operate at about 800-1000 °C, orange-hot. They are used in most small glass vacuum tubes, but are rarely used in high-power tubes because the coating is degraded by positive ions that bombard the cathode, accelerated by the high voltage on the tube.

For manufacturing convenience, the oxide-coated cathodes are usually coated with carbonates, which are then converted to oxides by heating. The activation may be achieved by microwave heating, direct electric current heating, or electron bombardment while the tube is on the exhausting machine, until the production of gases ceases. The purity of cathode materials is crucial for tube lifetime. The Ba content significantly increases on the surface layers of oxide cathodes down to several tens of nanometers in depth, after the cathode activation process. The lifetime of oxide cathodes can be evaluated with a stretched exponential function. The survivability of electron emission sources is significantly improved by high doping of high‐speed activator.

Barium oxide reacts with traces of silicon in the underlying metal, forming a barium silicate (Ba_{2}SiO_{4}) layer. This layer has high electrical resistance, especially under discontinuous current load, and acts as a resistor in series with the cathode. This is particularly undesirable for tubes used in computer applications, where they can stay without conducting current for extended periods of time.

Barium also sublimates from the heated cathode, and deposits on nearby structures. For electron tubes, where the grid is subjected to high temperatures and barium contamination would facilitate electron emission from the grid itself, higher proportion of calcium is added to the coating mix (up to 20% of calcium carbonate).

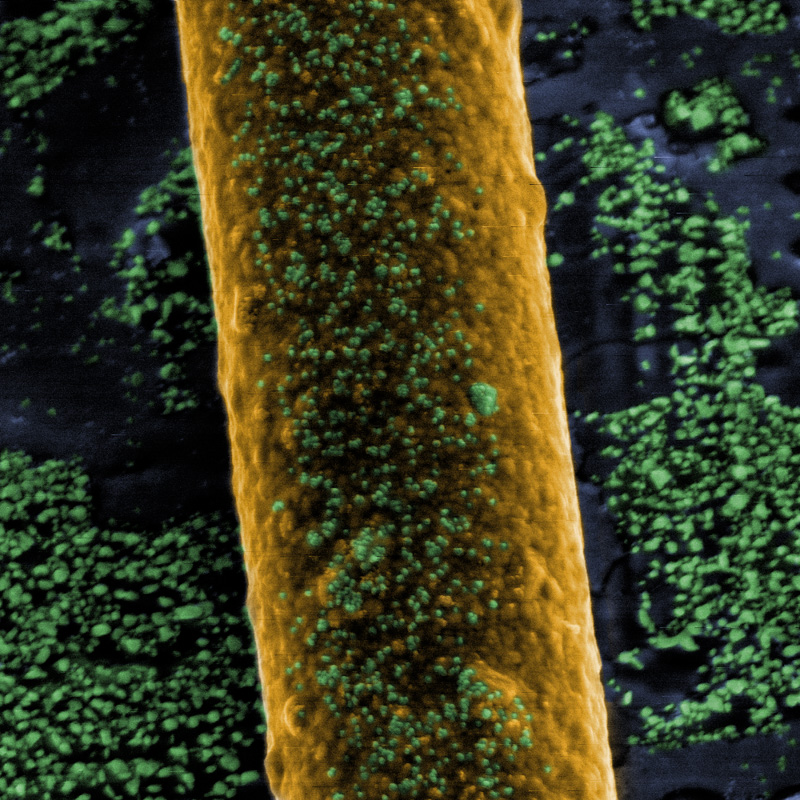
SEM Image of G1 Support and G1 Wire, of a heavily used Pentode showing Barium oxide Contamination (green) from the cathode.

=== Boride cathodes ===
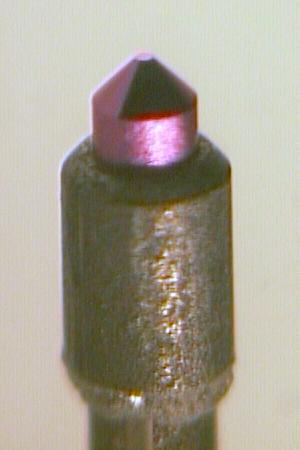
Lanthanum hexaboride hot cathode

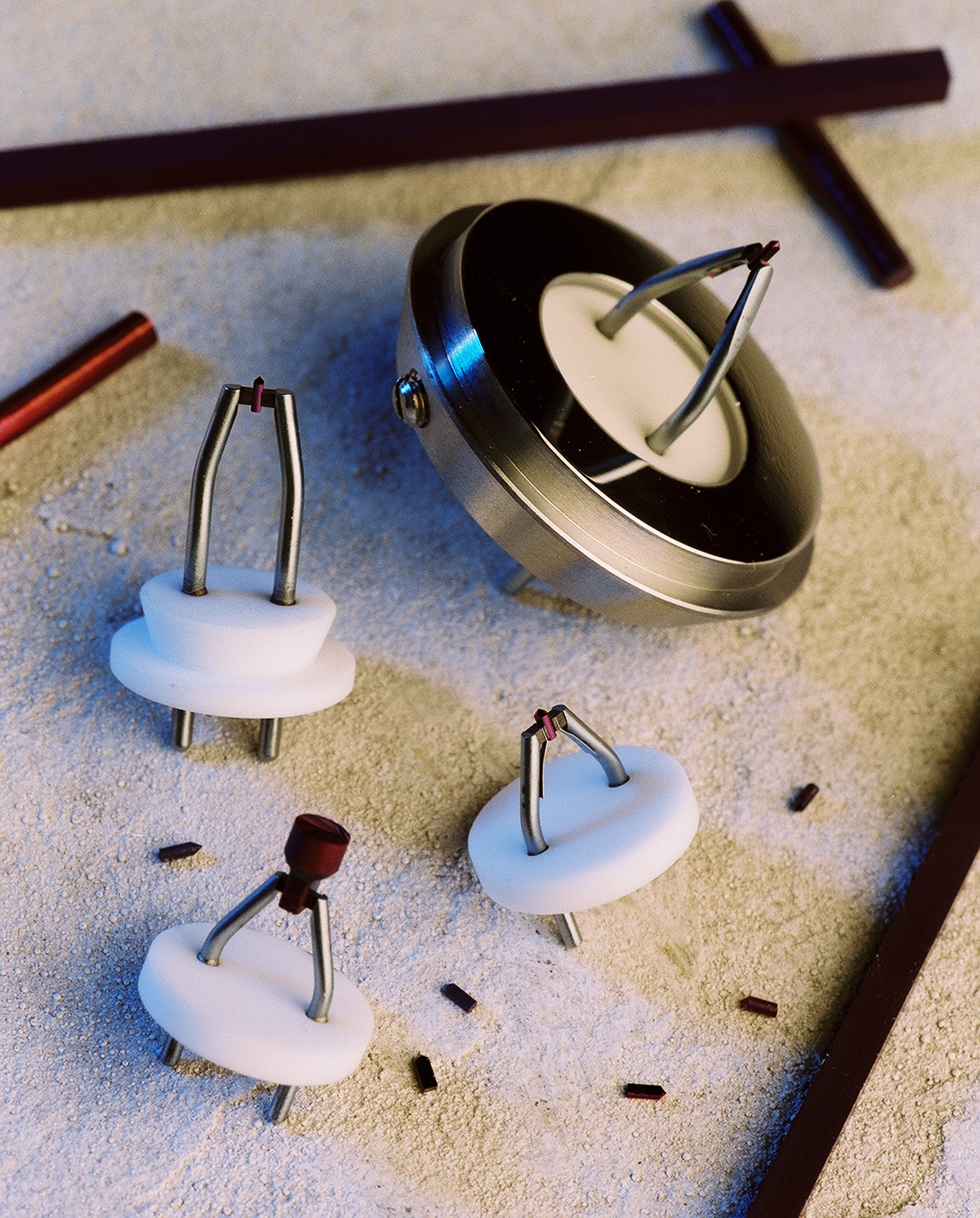
Lanthanum hexaboride hot cathodes

Lanthanum hexaboride (LaB_{6}) and cerium hexaboride (CeB_{6}) are used as the coating of some high-current cathodes. Hexaborides show low work function, around 2.5 eV. They are also resistant to poisoning. Cerium boride cathodes show lower evaporation rate at 1700 K than lanthanum boride, but it becomes equal at 1850 K and higher. Cerium boride cathodes have one and a half times the lifetime of lanthanum boride, due to its higher resistance to carbon contamination. Boride cathodes are about ten times as "bright" as the tungsten ones and have 10-15 times longer lifetime. They are used e.g. in electron microscopes, microwave tubes, electron lithography, electron beam welding, X-Ray tubes, and free electron lasers. However these materials tend to be expensive.

Other hexaborides can be employed as well; examples are calcium hexaboride, strontium hexaboride, barium hexaboride, yttrium hexaboride, gadolinium hexaboride, samarium hexaboride, and thorium hexaboride.

=== Thoriated filaments ===
A common type of directly heated cathode, used in most high power transmitting tubes, is the thoriated tungsten filament, discovered in 1914 and made practical by Irving Langmuir in 1923. A small amount of thorium is added to the tungsten of the filament. The filament is heated white-hot, at about 2400 °C, and thorium atoms migrate to the surface of the filament and form the emissive layer. Heating the filament in a hydrocarbon atmosphere carburizes the surface and stabilizes the emissive layer. Thoriated filaments can have very long lifetimes and are resistant to the ion bombardment that occurs at high voltages, because fresh thorium continually diffuses to the surface, renewing the layer. They are used in nearly all high-power vacuum tubes for radio transmitters, and in some tubes for hi-fi amplifiers. Their lifetimes tend to be longer than those of oxide cathodes.

==== Thorium alternatives ====
Due to concerns about thorium radioactivity and toxicity, efforts have been made to find alternatives. One of them is zirconiated tungsten, where zirconium dioxide is used instead of thorium dioxide. Other replacement materials are lanthanum(III) oxide, yttrium(III) oxide, cerium(IV) oxide, and their mixtures.

=== Other materials ===
In addition to the listed oxides and borides, other materials can be used as well. Some examples are carbides and borides of transition metals, e.g. zirconium carbide, hafnium carbide, tantalum carbide, hafnium diboride, and their mixtures. Metals from groups IIIB (scandium, yttrium, and some lanthanides, often gadolinium and samarium) and IVB (hafnium, zirconium, titanium) are usually chosen.

In addition to tungsten, other refractory metals and alloys can be used, e.g. tantalum, molybdenum and rhenium and their alloys.

A barrier layer of other material can be placed between the base metal and the emission layer, to inhibit chemical reaction between these. The material has to be resistant to high temperatures, have high melting point and very low vapor pressure, and be electrically conductive. Materials used can be e.g. tantalum diboride, titanium diboride, zirconium diboride, niobium diboride, tantalum carbide, zirconium carbide, tantalum nitride, and zirconium nitride.

== Cathode heater ==
A cathode heater is a heated wire filament used to heat the cathode in a vacuum tube or cathode ray tube. The cathode element has to achieve the required temperature in order for these tubes to function properly. This is why older electronics often need some time to "warm up" after being powered on; this phenomenon can still be observed in the cathode ray tubes of some modern televisions and computer monitors. The cathode heats to a temperature that causes electrons to be 'boiled out' of its surface into the evacuated space in the tube, a process called thermionic emission. The temperature required for modern oxide-coated cathodes is around 800–1,000 °C (1,470–1,830 °F).

The cathode is usually in the form of a long narrow sheet metal cylinder at the center of the tube. The heater consists of a fine wire or ribbon, made of a high resistance metal alloy like nichrome, similar to the heating element in a toaster but finer. It runs through the center of the cathode, often being coiled on tiny insulating supports or bent into hairpin-like shapes to give enough surface area to produce the required heat. Typical heaters have a ceramic coating on the wire. When it's bent sharply at the ends of the cathode sleeve, the wire is exposed. The ends of the wire are electrically connected to two of the several pins protruding from the end of the tube. When current passes through the wire it becomes red hot, and the radiated heat strikes the inside surface of the cathode, heating it. The red or orange glow seen coming from operating vacuum tubes is produced by the heater.

There is not much room in the cathode, and the cathode is often built with the heater wire touching it. The inside of the cathode is insulated by a coating of alumina (aluminum oxide). This is not a very good insulator at high temperatures, therefore tubes have a rating for maximum voltage between cathode and heater, usually only 200 to 300 V.

Heaters require a low voltage, high current source of power. Miniature receiving tubes for line-operated equipment use on the order of 0.5 to 4 watts for heater power; high power tubes such as rectifiers or output tubes use on the order of 10 to 20 watts, and broadcast transmitter tubes might need a kilowatt or more to heat the cathode. The voltage required is usually 5 or 6 volts AC. This is supplied by a separate 'heater winding' on the device's power supply transformer that also supplies the higher voltages required by the tubes' plates and other electrodes. One approach used in transformerless line-operated radio and television receivers such as the All American Five is to connect all the tube heaters in series across the supply line. Since all the heaters are rated at the same current, they would share voltage according to their heater ratings.

Battery-operated radio sets used direct-current power for the heaters (commonly known as filaments), and tubes intended for battery sets were designed to use as little filament power as necessary, to economize on battery replacement. The final models of tube-equipped radio receivers were built with subminiature tubes using less than 50 mA for the heaters, but these types were developed at about the same time as transistors which replaced them.

Where leakage or stray fields from the heater circuit could potentially be coupled to the cathode, direct current is sometimes used for heater power. This eliminates a source of noise in sensitive audio or instrumentation circuits.

The majority of power required to operate low power tube equipment is consumed by the heaters. Transistors have no such power requirement, which is often a great advantage.

== Failure modes ==
The emissive layers on coated cathodes degrade slowly with time, and much more quickly when the cathode is overloaded with too high current. The result is weakened emission and diminished power of the tubes, or in CRTs diminished brightness.

The activated electrodes can be destroyed by contact with oxygen or other chemicals (e.g. aluminium, or silicates), either present as residual gases, entering the tube via leaks, or released by outgassing or migration from the construction elements. This results in diminished emissivity. This process is known as cathode poisoning. High-reliability tubes had to be developed for the early Whirlwind computer, with filaments free of traces of silicon.

Slow degradation of the emissive layer and sudden burning and interruption of the filament are two main failure modes of vacuum tubes.

== Transmitting tube hot cathode characteristics ==
Material	Operating temperature	Emission efficacy	Specific emission
Tungsten	2500 K()	5 mA/W	500 mA/cm^{2}
Thoriated tungsten	2000 K(1726c)	100 mA/W	5 A/cm^{2}
Oxide coated	1000 K	500 mA/W	10 A/cm^{2}
Barium aluminate	1300 K	400 mA/W	4 A/cm^{2}

== See also ==
- Hot filament ionization gauge
