= Niobium diboride =

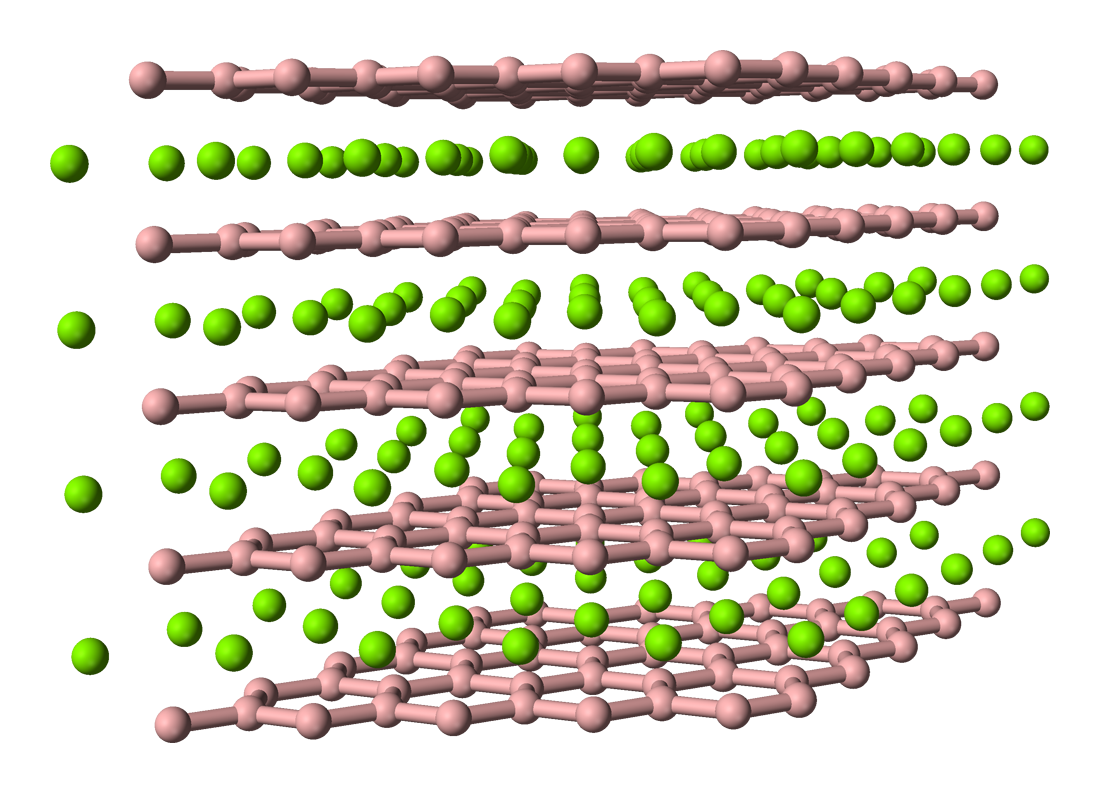

Names
- IUPAC name niobium diboride
- Systematic IUPAC name boron; niobium
- Other names NbB_{2}

Identifiers
CAS Number	12007-29-3
3D model (JSmol)	Interactive image
ChemSpider	21171230
EC Number	234-503-3
PubChem CID	49781553
- InChI: InChI=1S/2B.Nb Key: WCJIBJJSTRKWNY-UHFFFAOYSA-N
- SMILES: [B].[B].[Nb]

Properties
Chemical formula	NbB_{2}
Molar mass	114.526 g/mol
Appearance	grey powder
Density	6.97 g/cm^{3}
Melting point	~3050°C
Boiling point	N/A
Solubility in water	Insoluble

Structure
Crystal structure	Hexagonal, hP3 a = 3.085 Å, c = 3.311 Å and c/a = 1.071 Å
Space group	P6/mmm, No. 191

Hazards
- Occupational safety and health (OHS/OSH)
Main hazards	Uninvestigated
- Except where otherwise noted, data are given for materials in their standard state (at 25 °C [77 °F], 100 kPa). Infobox references

Niobium diboride (NbB_{2}) is a highly covalent refractory ceramic material with a hexagonal crystal structure.

== Preparation ==
NbB_{2} can be synthesized by stoichiometric reaction between constituent elements, in this case Nb and B. This reaction provides for precise stoichiometric control of the materials. Reduction of Nb_{2}O_{5} (or NbO_{2}) to niobium diboride can also be achieved via metallothermic reduction. Inexpensive precursor materials are used and reacted according to the reaction below:

Nb_{2}O_{5} + 2 B_{2}O_{3} + 11 Mg → 2 NbB_{2} + 11 MgO

Mg is used as a reactant in order to allow for acid leaching of unwanted oxide products. Stoichiometric excesses of Mg and B_{2}O_{3} are often required during metallothermic reductions in order to consume all available niobium oxide.

=== Nanomaterial ===
Borothermal reduction of NbO_{2} with elemental boron via solid‐state reaction results in nanorods (40 × 800 nm^{2}). A variation of the borothermal reduction in molten salt using Nb_{2}O_{5} with elemental boron produces nanocrystals (61 nm).

Nanocrystals of NbB_{2} were successfully synthesized by Zoli's reaction, a reduction of Nb_{2}O_{5} with NaBH_{4} using a molar ratio M:B of 1:4 at 700 °C for 30 min under argon flow.

Nb_{2}O_{5} + 13/2 NaBH_{4} → 2 NbB_{2} + 4Na(g,l) + 5/2 NaBO_{2} + 13 H_{2}(g)

== Properties and use ==
NbB_{2} is an ultra high temperature ceramic (UHTC) with a melting point of 3050 °C. This along with its relatively low density of ~6.97 g/cm^{3} and good high temperature strength makes it a candidate for high temperature aerospace applications such as hypersonic flight or rocket propulsion systems. It is an unusual ceramic, having relatively high thermal and electrical conductivities (electrical resistivity of 25.7 μΩ⋅cm, CTE of 7.7⋅10^{−6}/°C), properties it shares with isostructural titanium diboride, zirconium diboride, hafnium diboride and tantalum diboride.

NbB_{2} parts are usually hot pressed or spark plasma sintering (mechanical pressure applied to the heated powder) and then machined to shape. Sintering of NbB_{2} is hindered by the material's covalent nature and presence of surface oxides which increase grain coarsening before densification during sintering. Pressureless sintering of NbB_{2} is possible with sintering additives such as boron carbide and carbon which react with the surface oxides to increase the driving force for sintering but mechanical properties are degraded compared to hot pressed NbB_{2}.
