= Ultra-high temperature ceramic =

Type of refractory ceramics

Ultra-high-temperature ceramics (UHTCs) are a type of refractory ceramics that can withstand extremely high temperatures without degrading, often above 2,000 °C. They also often have high thermal conductivities and are highly resistant to thermal shock, meaning they can withstand sudden and extreme changes in temperature without cracking or breaking. Chemically, they are usually borides, carbides, nitrides, and oxides of early transition metals.

UHTCs are used in various high-temperature applications, such as heat shields for spacecraft, furnace linings, hypersonic aircraft components and nuclear reactor components. They can be fabricated through various methods, including hot pressing, spark plasma sintering, and chemical vapor deposition. Despite their advantages, UHTCs also have some limitations, such as their brittleness and difficulty in machining. However, ongoing research is focused on improving the processing techniques and mechanical properties of UHTCs.

== History ==
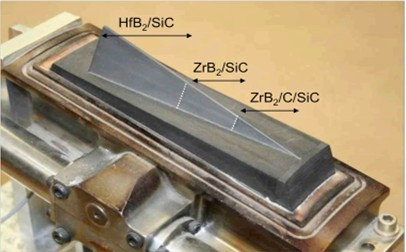
Figure 1. An UHTC strake composed of three different sections with different UHTC compositions.

Beginning in the early 1960s, demand for high-temperature materials by the nascent aerospace industry prompted the United States Air Force Materials Laboratory to begin funding the development of a new class of materials that could withstand the environment of proposed hypersonic vehicles such as the Boeing X-20 Dyna-Soar and the Space Shuttle at Manlabs Incorporated. Through a systematic investigation of the refractory properties of binary ceramics, they discovered that the early transition metal borides, carbides, and nitrides had surprisingly high thermal conductivity, resistance to oxidation, and reasonable mechanical strength when small grain sizes were used. Of these, ZrB_{2} and HfB_{2} in composites containing approximately 20% volume SiC were found to be the best performing.

UHTC research was largely abandoned after the pioneering mid-century Manlabs work due to the completion of the Space Shuttle missions and the elimination of the Air force spaceplane development. Three decades later, however, research interest was rekindled by a string of 1990s era NASA programs aimed at developing a fully reusable hypersonic spaceplane such as the National Aerospace Plane, Venturestar/X-33, Boeing X-37, and the Air Force's Blackstar program. New research in UHTCs was led by NASA Ames, with research at the center continuing to the present through funding from the NASA Fundamental Aeronautics Program. UHTCs also saw expanded use in varied environments, from nuclear engineering to aluminum production.

Production of a hafnium diboride set of fins via robocasting, a 3D Printing technique. 0.41 mm nozzle, 4x speed.

In order to test real world performance of UHTC materials in reentry environments, NASA Ames conducted two flight experiments in 1997 and 2000. The slender Hypersonic Aero-thermodynamic Research Probes (SHARP B1 and B2) briefly exposed the UHTC materials to actual reentry environments by mounting them on modified nuclear ordnance Mk12A reentry vehicles and launching them on Minuteman III ICBMs. Sharp B-1 had a HfB2/SiC nosecone with a tip radius of 3.5 mm which experienced temperatures well above 2,815 °C during reentry, ablating away at an airspeed of 6.9 km/s as predicted; however, it was not recovered and its axially-symmetric cone shape did not provide flexural strength data needed to evaluate the performance of UHTCs in linear leading edges. To improve the characterization of UHTC mechanical strength and better study their performance, SHARP-B2, was recovered and included four retractable, sharp wedge-like protrusions called "strakes" which each contained three different UHTC compositions which were extended into the reentry flow at different altitudes.

The SHARP-B2 test that followed permitted recovery of four segmented strakes which had three sections, each consisting of a different HfB_{2} or ZrB_{2} composite as shown in Figure 1. The vehicle was successfully recovered, despite the fact that it impacted the sea at three times the predicted velocity. The four rear strake segments (HfB_{2}) fractured between 14 and 19 seconds into reentry, two mid segments (ZrB_{2}/SiC) fractured, and no fore strake segments (ZrB_{2}/SiC/C) failed. The actual heat flux was 60% less than expected, actual temperatures were much lower than expected, and heat flux on the rear strakes was much higher than expected. The material failures were found to result from very large grain sizes in the composites and pure ceramics, with cracks following macroscopic crystal grain boundaries. Since this test, NASA Ames has continued refining production techniques for UHTC synthesis and performing basic research on UHTCs.

== Physical properties ==
Most research conducted in the last two decades has focused on improving the performance of the two most promising compounds developed by Manlabs, ZrB_{2} and HfB_{2}, though significant work has continued in characterizing the nitrides, oxides, and carbides of the group four and five elements. In comparison to carbides and nitrides, the diborides tend to have higher thermal conductivity but lower melting points, a tradeoff which gives them good thermal shock resistance and makes them ideal for many high-temperature thermal applications. The melting points of many UHTCs are shown in Table 1. Despite the high melting points of pure UHTCs, they are unsuitable for many refractory applications because of their high susceptibility to oxidation at elevated temperatures.

Table 1. Crystal structures, densities, and melting points of selected UHTCs.

Material	Formula	Crystal structure	Lattice parameters (Å)			Density (g/cm^{3})	Melting point	
Material	Formula	Crystal structure	a	b	c	Density (g/cm^{3})	(°C)	(°F)
Hafnium carbonitride	HfCN	Cubic	–	–	–	12.65	4,110	7,430
Hafnium carbide	HfC	FCC	4.638	4.638	4.638	12.76	3,958	7,156
Tantalum carbide	TaC	Cubic	4.455	4.455	4.455	14.50	3,768	6,814
Niobium carbide	NbC	Cubic	-	-	-	7.820	3,490	-
Zirconium carbide	ZrC	Cubic	4.693	4.693	4.693	6.56	3,400	6,152
Hafnium nitride	HfN	FCC	4.525	4.525	4.525	13.9	3,385	6,125
Hafnium boride	HfB_{2}	Hexagonal	3.142	–	3.476	11.19	3,380	6,116
Thorium dioxide	ThO_{2}	Fluorite	-	-	-	10.0	3,350	6,060
Zirconium boride	ZrB_{2}	Hexagonal	3.169	–	3.530	6.10	3,245	5,873
Titanium boride	TiB_{2}	Hexagonal	3.030	–	3.230	4.52	3,225	5,837
Titanium carbide	TiC	Cubic	4.327	4.327	4.327	4.94	3,100	5,612
Niobium boride	NbB_{2}	Hexagonal	3.085	-	3.311	6.97	3,050	
Tantalum boride	TaB_{2}	Hexagonal	3.098	–	3.227	12.54	3,040	5,504
Titanium nitride	TiN	FCC	4.242	4.242	4.242	5.39	2,950	5,342
Zirconium nitride	ZrN	FCC	4.578	4.578	4.578	7.29	2,950	5,342
Magnesium oxide	MgO	Cubic	-	-	-	3.6	2,852	5,166
Vanadium carbide	VC	Cubic	-	-	-	5.77	2,810 unstable	-
Zirconium dioxide	ZrO_{2}	Monoclinic	-	-	-	5.68	2,715	4,919
Tantalum nitride	TaN	Cubic	4.330	4.330	4.330	14.30	2,700	4,892
Calcium oxide	CaO	Cubic	-	-	-	3.34	2,613	4,735
Niobium nitride	NbN	Cubic	-	-	-	8.470	2,573	-
Silicon carbide	SiC	Polymorphic	–	Various	–	3.21	2,545	4,613
Aluminum oxide	Al_{2}O_{3}	HCP	4.750	4.750	4.750	3.987	2,072	3,762
Vanadium nitride	VN	Cubic	-	-	-	6.13	2,050 unstable ?	-

=== Structure ===
UHTCs all exhibit strong covalent bonding which gives them structural stability at high temperatures. Metal carbides are brittle due to the strong bonds that exist between carbon atoms. The largest class of carbides, including Hf, Zr, Ti and Ta carbides have high melting points due to covalent carbon networks although carbon vacancies often exist in these materials; indeed, HfC has one of the highest melting points of any material. Nitrides such as ZrN and HfN have similarly strong covalent bonds but their refractory nature makes them especially difficult to synthesize and process. The stoichiometric nitrogen content can be varied in these complexes based on the synthetic technique utilized; different nitrogen content will give different properties to the material, such as how if x exceeds 1.2 in ZrNx, a new optically transparent and electrically insulating phase appears to form. Ceramic borides such as HfB_{2} and ZrB_{2} benefit from very strong bonding between boron atoms as well as strong metal to boron bonds; the hexagonal close-packed structure with alternating two-dimensional boron and metal sheets give these materials high but anisotropic strength as single crystals. Borides exhibit high thermal conductivity (on the order of 75–105 W/mK) and low coefficients of thermal expansion (5–7.8 × 10^{−6} K^{−1}) and improved oxidation resistance in comparison to other classes of UHTCs. Thermal expansion, thermal conductivity and other data are shown in Table 2. The crystal structures, lattice parameters, densities, and melting points of different UHTCs are shown in Table 1.

Table 2. Thermal expansion coefficients across selected temperature ranges and thermal conductivity at a fixed temperature for selected UHTCs.

Material	Thermal expansion (10^{−6}/K)	Temp. range (°C)	Thermal cond. (W/mK)	Temperature (°C)
HfB_{2}–20%SiC			62	1,000
ZrB_{2}–20%SiC	5–7.8	400–1,600	78	1,000
HfN	6.5	20–1,000	22	800
HfC	6.6	20–1,500	30	800
HfB_{2}	7.6	20–2,205	70	800
TiB_{2}	8.6	20–2,205		
ZrB_{2}	8.3	20–2,205		
TaB_{2}	8.4	1,027–2,027	36.2	2,027
ZrC	5.2	1,027–2,027		
TiC	7.7	20–1,500		
TaC	6.3	20–1,500		
SiC	1.1–5.5	20–1,500	26.3	1,500

=== Thermodynamic properties ===
In comparison with carbide and nitride-based ceramics, diboride-based UHTCs exhibit higher thermal conductivity (refer to Table 2, where we can see that hafnium diboride has thermal conductivity of 105, 75, 70 W/m*K at different temperature while hafnium carbide and nitride have values only around 20W/m*K). Thermal shock resistance of HfB_{2} and ZrB_{2} was investigated by ManLabs and it was found that these materials did not fail at thermal gradients sufficient for the failure of SiC; indeed, it was found that hollow cylinders could not be cracked by an applied radial thermal gradient without first being notched on the inner surface. UHTCs generally exhibit thermal expansion coefficients in the range of 5.9–8.3 × 10^{−6} K^{−1}.The structural and thermal stability of ZrB_{2} and HfB_{2} UHTCs results from the occupancy of bonding and antibonding levels in hexagonal MB_{2} structures with alternating hexagonal sheets of metal and boride atoms. In such structures, the principal frontier electronic states are bonding and antibonding orbitals resulting from bonding between boron 2p orbitals and metal d orbitals; before group (IV), the number of available electrons in a unit cell is insufficient to fill all bonding orbitals, and beyond it they begin to fill the antibonding orbitals. Both effects reduce the overall bonding strength in the unit cell and therefore the enthalpy of formation and melting point. Experimental evidence shows that as one moves across the transition metal series in a given period, the enthalpy of formation of MB_{2} ceramics increases and peaks at Ti, Zr, and Hf before decaying as the metal gets heavier. As a result, the enthalpies of formation of several important UHTCs are as follows: HfB_{2} > TiB_{2} > ZrB_{2} > TaB_{2} > NbB_{2} > VB_{2}.

=== Mechanical properties ===
Table 3 lists UHTC carbides and borides mechanical properties. It is extremely important that UHTCs are able to retain high bending strength and hardness at high temperatures (above 2000 °C). UHTCs generally exhibit hardness above 20 GPa due to the strong covalent bonds present in these materials. However, the different methods of processing UHTCs can lead to great variation in hardness values. UHTCs exhibit high flexural strengths of > 200 MPa at 1,800 °C, and UHTCs with fine-grained particles exhibit higher flexural strengths than UHTCs with coarse grains. It has been shown that diboride ceramics synthesized as a composite with silicon carbide (SiC) exhibit increased fracture toughness (increase of 20% to 4.33 MPam^{1/2}) relative to the pure diborides. This is due to material densification and a reduction in grain size upon processing.

Table. 3 Flexural strength, hardness, and Young's Modulus at given temperatures for selected UHTCs.

The UHTC composites show higher mechanical properties like Tensile strength, Young's modulus, hardness, flexural strength, and fracture toughness at high temperatures as compared to monolithic UHTCs. The high sintering temperature and pressure result in high residual stress in the composites, which can be released at high temperatures. Therefore, the mechanical properties increase with the increase in temperature.

At 1,200 °C, the flexural strength of SiC is 170 MPa vs SiC-ZrC (10 wt%) is 350 MPa. At 2,000 °C, Titanium Carbide's flexural strength is 410 MPa vs TiC-WC (5% vol) is 491 MPa vs TiC-SiC (40% vol) is 543 MPa. Similarly the flexural strength for TaC-SiC (20% vol) is 715 MPa at 1,900 °C which is about 40% higher than TaC (500 MPa) at the same temperature.

The Young's modulus for TiC-WC (3.5 wt%) - CNT(2 wt%) at 1,600 °C is 428 GPa vs 300 GPa for TiC and the flexural toughness of TiC-WC (3.5 wt%) - CNT (2 wt%) at the same temperature is 8.1 MPa m^{1/2} as compared to TiC which is 3.7 MPa m^{1/2}. For ZrC the fracture toughness at 1,900 °C is 4 MPa m^{1/2} which increases to 5.8 MPa m^{1/2} for ZrC-ZrO_{2}(40 wt.%).

The high strength of the materials is obtained due to the high homogeneities of the microstructures and the solute dispersion in the microstructures.

A significant enhancement in hardness (~30%) of (Hf-Ta-Zr-Nb)C material compared to the monolithic UHTCs (HfC, TaC, ZrC, NbC) and in comparison to the hardest monocarbide (HfC) and the binary (Hf-Ta)C was recorded. The mechanism behind this enhancement in hardness maybe because of bonding behavior or some solid solution hardening effects arising from localized lattice strains.

For applications based on combustion harsh environments and aerospace, Monolithic UHTCs are of concern because of their low fracture toughness and brittle behavior. UHTC composites are a potential approach to overcome these deficiencies.

Material	Temperature(°C)	Young's Modulus(GPa)	Flexural Strength(MPa)	Hardness(GPa)
HfB_{2}	23	530	480	21.2–28.4
	800	485	570	
	1,400	300	170	
	1,800		280	
HfB_{2}–20%SiC	23	540	420	
	800	530	380	
	1,400	410	180	
	1,800		280	
ZrB_{2}	23	500	380	28.0
	800	480	430	
	1,400	360	150	
	1,800		200	
ZrB_{2}–20%SiC	23	540	400	
	800	500	450	
	1,400	430	340	
	1,800		270	
TaB_{2}	23	257		25.0
NbB_{2}	23	539		20.25
TiB_{2}	23	551	370	33.0
HfC	23	352		26.0
ZrC	23	348		27.0
TiC	23	451		30.0
TaC	23	285		18.2
SiC	23	415	359	32
	1,000	392	397	8.9

=== Chemical properties ===
While UHTCs have desirable thermal and mechanical properties, they are susceptible to oxidation at their elevated operating temperatures. The metal component oxidizes to a gas such as CO_{2} or NO_{2}, which is rapidly lost at the elevated temperatures UHTCs are most useful at; boron, for example, readily oxidizes to B_{2}O_{3} which becomes a liquid at 490 °C and vaporizes very rapidly above 1,100 °C; in addition, their brittleness makes them poor engineering materials. Current research targets increasing their toughness and oxidation resistance by exploring composites with silicon carbide, the incorporation of fibers, and the addition of rare-earth hexaborides such as lanthanum hexaboride (LaB_{6}). It has been found that the oxidative resistance of HfB_{2} and ZrB_{2} are greatly enhanced through the inclusion of 30% weight silicon carbide due to the formation of a protective glassy surface layer upon the application of temperatures in excess of 1,000 °C composed of SiO_{2}. To determine the effect of SiC content on diboride oxidation, ManLabs conducted a series of furnace oxidation experiments, in which the oxidation scale thickness as a function of temperature for pure HfB_{2}, SiC and HfB_{2} 20 v% SiC were compared. At temperatures greater than 2,100 K the oxide scale thickness on pure HfB_{2} is thinner than that on pure SiC, and HfB_{2}/20% SiC has the best oxidation resistance. Extreme heat treatment leads to greater oxidation resistance as well as improved mechanical properties such as fracture resistance.

== Synthesis of diboride (Zr, Hf, Ti) UHTCs ==
UHTCs possess simple empirical formulas and thus can be prepared by a wide variety of synthetic methods. UHTCs such as ZrB_{2} can be synthesized by stoichiometric reaction between constituent elements, in this case Zr and B. This reaction provides for precise stoichiometric control of the materials. At 2,000 K, the formation of ZrB_{2} via stoichiometric reaction is thermodynamically favorable (ΔG=−279.6 kJ mol^{−1}) and therefore, this route can be used to produce ZrB_{2} by self-propagating high-temperature synthesis (SHS). This technique takes advantage of the high exothermic energy of the reaction to cause high temperature, fast combustion reactions. Advantages of SHS include higher purity of ceramic products, increased sinterability, and shorter processing times. However, the extremely rapid heating rates can result in incomplete reactions between Zr and B, the formation of stable oxides of Zr, and the retention of porosity. Stoichiometric reactions have also been carried out by reaction of attrition milled (wearing materials by grinding) Zr and B powder (and then hot pressing at 600 °C for 6 h), and nanoscale particles have been obtained by reacting attrition milled Zr and B precursor crystallites (10 nm in size). Unfortunately, all of the stoichiometric reaction methods for synthesizing UHTCs employ expensive charge materials, and therefore these methods are not useful for large-scale or industrial applications.

Reduction of ZrO_{2} and HfO_{2} to their respective diborides can also be achieved via metallothermic reduction. Inexpensive precursor materials are used and reacted according to the reaction below:

ZrO_{2} + B_{2}O_{3} + 5Mg → ZrB_{2} + 5MgO

Mg is used as a reactant in order to allow for acid leaching of unwanted oxide products. Stoichiometric excesses of Mg and B_{2}O_{3} are often required during metallothermic reductions in order to consume all available ZrO_{2}. These reactions are exothermic and can be used to produce the diborides by SHS. Production of ZrB_{2} from ZrO_{2} via SHS often leads to incomplete conversion of reactants, and therefore double SHS (DSHS) has been employed by some researchers. A second SHS reaction with Mg and H_{3}BO_{3} as reactants along with the ZrB_{2}/ZrO_{2} mixture yields increased conversion to the diboride, and particle sizes of 25–40 nm at 800 °C. After metallothermic reduction and DSHS reactions, MgO can be separated from ZrB_{2} by mild acid leaching.

Synthesis of UHTCs by boron carbide reduction is one of the most popular methods for UHTC synthesis. The precursor materials for this reaction (ZrO_{2}/TiO_{2}/HfO_{2} and B_{4}C) are less expensive than those required by the stoichiometric and borothermic reactions. ZrB_{2} is prepared at greater than 1,600 °C for at least 1 hour by the following reaction:

2ZrO_{2} + B_{4}C + 3C → 2ZrB_{2} + 4CO

This method requires a slight excess of boron, as some boron is oxidized during boron carbide reduction. ZrC has also been observed as a product from the reaction, but if the reaction is carried out with 20–25% excess B_{4}C, the ZrC phase disappears, and only ZrB_{2} remains. Lower synthesis temperatures (~1,600 °C) produce UHTCs that exhibit finer grain sizes and better sinterability. Boron carbide must be subjected to grinding prior to the boron carbide reduction in order to promote oxide reduction and diffusion processes.

Boron carbide reductions can also be carried out via reactive plasma spraying if a UHTC coating is desired. Precursor or powder particles react with plasma at high temperatures (6,000–15,000 °C) which greatly reduces the reaction time. ZrB_{2} and ZrO_{2} phases have been formed using a plasma voltage and current of 50 V and 500 A, respectively. These coating materials exhibit uniform distribution of fine particles and porous microstructures, which increased hydrogen flow rates.

Another method for the synthesis of UHTCs is the borothermic reduction of ZrO_{2}, TiO_{2}, or HfO_{2} with B. At temperatures higher than 1600 °C, pure diborides can be obtained from this method. Due to the loss of some boron as boron oxide, excess boron is needed during borothermic reduction. Mechanical milling can lower the reaction temperature required during borothermic reduction. This is due to the increased particle mixing and lattice defects that result from decreased particle sizes of ZnO_{2} and B after milling. This method is also not very useful for industrial applications due to the loss of expensive boron as boron oxide during the reaction.

Nanocrystals of group IV and V metal diborides such as TiB_{2}, ZrB_{2}, HfB_{2}, NbB_{2}, TaB_{2} were successfully synthesized by Zoli's Reaction, reduction of TiO_{2}, ZrO_{2}, HfO_{2}, Nb_{2}BO_{5}, Ta_{2}O_{5} with NaBH_{4} using a molar ratio M:B of 1:4 at 700 °C for 30 minutes under argon flow.

MO_{2} + 3NaBH_{4} → MB_{2} + 2Na(g,l) + NaBO_{2} + 6H_{2}(g) (M=Ti, Zr, Hf)

M_{2}O_{5} + 6.5NaBH_{4} → 2MB_{2} + 4Na(g,l) + 2.5NaBO_{2}+ 13H_{2}(g) (M=Nb,Ta)

UHTCs can be prepared from solution-based synthesis methods as well, although few substantial studies have been conducted. Solution-based methods allow for low temperature synthesis of ultrafine UHTC powders. Yan et al. have synthesized ZrB_{2} powders using the inorganic-organic precursors ZrOCl_{2}•8H_{2}O, boric acid and phenolic resin at 1,500 °C. The synthesized powders exhibit 200 nm crystallite size and low oxygen content (~ 1.0 wt%). UHTC preparation from polymeric precursors has also been recently investigated. ZrO_{2} and HfO_{2} can be dispersed in boron carbide polymeric precursors prior to reaction. Heating the reaction mixture to 1,500 °C results in the in situ generation of boron carbide and carbon, and the reduction of ZrO_{2} to ZrB_{2} soon follows. The polymer must be stable, processable, and contain boron and carbon in order to be useful for the reaction. Dinitrile polymers formed from the condensation of dinitrile with decaborane satisfy these criteria.

Chemical vapor deposition (CVD) of titanium and zirconium diborides is another method for preparing coatings of UHTCs. These techniques rely on metal halide and boron halide precursors (such as TiCl_{4} and BCl_{3}) in the gaseous phase and use H2 as a reducing agent. This synthesis route can be employed at low temperatures and produces thin films for coating on metal (and other material) surfaces. Mojima et al. have used CVD to prepare coatings of ZrB_{2} on Cu at 700–900 °C (Figure 2). Plasma enhanced CVD (PECVD) has also been used to prepare UHTC diborides. After plasma of the reacting gases is created (by radio frequency or direct current discharge between two electrodes) the reaction takes place, followed by deposition. The deposition takes place at lower temperatures compared to traditional CVD because only the plasma needs to be heated to provide sufficient energy for the reaction. ZrB_{2} has been prepared via PECVD at temperatures lower than 600 °C as a coating on zircalloy. Zirconium borohydride can also be used as a precursor in PECVD. Thermal decomposition of Zr(BH)_{4} to ZrB_{2} can occur at temperatures in the range of 150–400 °C in order to prepare amorphous, conductive films.

== Processing of UHTCs and the addition of SiC ==
Diboride-based UHTCs often require high-temperature and -pressure processing to produce dense, durable materials. The high melting points and strong covalent interactions present in UHTCs make it difficult to achieve uniform densification in these materials. Densification is only achieved at temperatures above 1800 °C once grain boundary diffusion mechanisms become active. Unfortunately, processing of UHTCs at these temperatures results in materials with larger grain sizes and poor mechanical properties including reduced toughness and hardness. To achieve densification at lower temperatures, several techniques can be employed: additives such as SiC can be used in order to form a liquid phase at the sintering temperature, the surface oxide layer can be removed, or the defect concentration can be increased. SiC can react with the surface oxide layer in order to provide diboride surfaces with higher energy: adding 5–30 vol% SiC has demonstrated improved densification and oxidation resistance of UHTCs. SiC can be added as a powder or a polymer to diboride UHTCs. The addition of SiC as a polymer has several advantages over the more traditional addition of SiC as a powder because SiC forms along the grain boundaries when added as a polymer, which increases measures of fracture toughness (by ~24%). In addition to improved mechanical properties, less SiC needs to be added when using this method, which limits the pathways for oxygen to diffuse into the material and react. Although addition of additives such as SiC can improve densification of UHTC materials, these additives lower the maximum temperature at which UHTCs can operate due to the formation of eutectic liquids. The addition of SiC to ZrB_{2} lowers the operating temperature of ZrB_{2} from 3,245 °C to 2,270 °C.

Hot pressing is a popular method for obtaining densified UHTC materials that relies upon both high temperatures and pressures to produce densified materials. Powder compacts are heated externally and pressure is applied hydraulitically. In order to improve densification during hot pressing, diboride powders can undergo milling by attrition to obtain powders of <2μm. Milling also allows for more uniform dispersion of the additive SiC. Hot pressing temperature, pressure, heating rate, reaction atmosphere, and holding times are all factors that affect the density and microstructure of UHTC pellets obtained from this method. In order to achieve >99% densification from hot pressing, temperatures of 1,800–2,000 °C and pressures of 30 MPa or greater are required. UHTC materials with 20 vol.% SiC and toughened with 5% carbon black as additives exhibit increased densification above 1,500 °C, but these materials still require temperatures of 1,900 °C and a pressure of 30 MPa in order to obtain near theoretical densities. Other additives such as Al_{2}O_{3} and Y_{2}O_{3} have also been used during the hot pressing of ZrB_{2}-SiC composites at 1800 °C. These additives react with impurities to form a transient liquid phase and promote sintering of the diboride composites. The addition of rare earth oxides such as Y_{2}O_{3}, Yb_{2}O_{3}, La_{2}O_{3} and Nd_{2}O_{3} can lower densification temperatures and can react with surface oxides to promote densification. Hot pressing may result in improved densities for UHTCs, but it is an expensive technique that relies on high temperatures and pressures to provide useful materials.

Pressureless sintering is another method for processing and densifying UHTCs. Pressureless sintering involves heating powdered materials in a mold in order to promote atomic diffusion and create a solid material. Compacts are prepared by uniaxial die compaction, and then the compacts are fired at chosen temperatures in a controlled atmosphere. Exaggerated grain growth that hinders densification occurs during sintering due to the low-intrinsic sinterability and the strong covalent bonds of Ti, Zr, and Hf diborides. Full densification of ZrB_{2} by pressureless sintering is very difficult to obtain; Chamberlain et al. have only been able to obtain ~98% densification by heating at 2,150 °C for 9 h (Figure 3). Efforts to control grain size and improve densification have focused on adding third phases to the UHTCs, some examples of these phases include the addition of boron and iridium. Addition of Ir in particular has shown an increase in the toughness of HfB_{2}/20 vol.% SiC by 25%. Sintered density has also been shown to increase with the addition of Fe (up to 10% w/w) and Ni (up to 50% w/w) to achieve densifications of up to 88% at 1,600 °C. More advances in pressureless sintering must be made before it can be considered a viable method for UHTC processing.

Spark plasma sintering is another method for the processing of UHTC materials. Spark plasma sintering often relies on slightly lower temperatures and significantly reduced processing times compared to hot pressing. During spark plasma sintering, a pulsed direct current passes through graphite punch rods and dies with uniaxial pressure exerted on the sample material. Grain growth is suppressed by rapid heating over the range 1,500–1,900 °C; this minimizes the time the material has to coarsen. Higher densities, cleaner grain boundaries, and elimination of surface impurities can all be achieved with spark plasma sintering. Spark plasma sintering also uses a pulsed current to generate an electrical discharge that cleans surface oxides off of the powder. This enhances grain boundary diffusion and migration as well as densification of the material. The UHTC composite ZrB_{2}/20 vol%SiC can be prepared with 99% density at 2,000 °C in 5 min via spark plasma sintering. ZrB2-SiC composites have also been prepared by spark plasma sintering at 1,400 °C over a period of 9 min. Spark plasma sintering has proven to be a useful technique for the synthesis of UHTCs, especially for preparation of UHTCs with smaller grain sizes.

== Applications ==
UHTCs, specifically Hf and Zr based diboride, are being developed to handle the forces and temperatures experienced by leading vehicle edges in atmospheric reentry and sustained hypersonic flight. The surfaces of hypersonic vehicles experience extreme temperatures in excess of 2,500 °C while also being exposed to high-temperature, high-flow-rate oxidizing plasma. The material design challenges associated with developing such surfaces have so far limited the design of orbital re-entry bodies and hypersonic air-breathing vehicles such as scramjets and DARPA's HTV because the bow shock in front of a blunt body protects the underlying surface from the full thermal force of the onrushing plasma with a thick layer of relatively dense and cool plasma.

Sharp edges dramatically reduce drag, but the current generation of thermal protection system materials are unable to withstand the considerably higher forces and temperatures experienced by sharp leading edges in reentry conditions. The relation between radius of curvature and temperature in a leading edge is inversely proportional, i.e. as radius decreases temperature increases during hypersonic flight. Vehicles with "sharp" leading edges have significantly higher lift to drag ratios, enhancing the fuel efficiency of sustained flight vehicles such as DARPA's HTV-3 and the landing cross-range and operational flexibility of reusable orbital spaceplane concepts being developed such as the Reaction Engines Skylon and Boeing X-33.

Zirconium diboride is used in many boiling water reactor fuel assemblies due to its refractory nature, corrosion resistance, high-neutron-absorption cross-section of 759 barns, and stoichiometric boron content. Boron acts as a "burnable" neutron absorber because its two isotopes, 10B and 11B, both transmute into stable nuclear reaction products upon neutron absorption (4He + 7Li and 12C, respectively) and therefore act as sacrificial materials which protect other components which become more radioactive with exposure to thermal neutrons. However, the boron in ZrB2|ZrB_{2} must be enriched in 11B because the gaseous helium evolved by 10B strains the fuel pellet of UO_{2} creates a gap between coating and fuel, and increases the fuel's centerline temperature; such cladding materials have been used on the uranium oxide fuel pellets in Westinghouse AP-1000 nuclear reactors. The high thermal neutron absorbance of boron also has the secondary effect of biasing the neutron spectrum to higher energies, so the fuel pellet retains more radioactive 239Pu at the end of a fuel cycle. In addition to this deleterious effect of integrating a neutron absorber on the surface of a fuel pellet, boron coatings have the effect of creating a power density bulge in the middle of a nuclear reactor fuel cycle through the superposition of 235U depletion and faster burning of 11B. To help level out this bulge, ZrB_{2}/Gd cermets are being studied which would extend fuel lifetime by superimposing three simultaneous degradation curves.

Due to the combination of refractory properties, high thermal conductivity, and the advantages of large stoichiometric boron content outlined in the above discussion of integral neutron absorbing fuel pellet cladding, refractory diborides have been used as control rod materials and have been studied for use in space nuclear power applications. While boron carbide is the most popular material for fast breeder reactors due to its lack of expense, extreme hardness comparable to diamond, and high cross-section, it completely disintegrates after a 5% burnup and is reactive when in contact with refractory metals. Hafnium diboride also suffers from high susceptibility to material degradation with boron transmutation, but its high melting point of 3,380 °C and the large thermal neutron capture cross section of hafnium of 113 barns and low reactivity with refractory metals such as tungsten makes it an attractive control rod material when clad with a refractory metal.

Titanium diboride is a popular material for handling molten aluminum due to its electrical conductivity, refractory properties, and its ability to wet with molten aluminum providing a superior electrical interface while not contaminating the aluminum with boron or titanium. TiB_{2} has been used as a drained cathode in the electroreduction of molten Al(III). In drained-cathode processes, aluminum can be produced with an electrode gap of only 0.25 m with an accompanying reduction in required voltage. However, implementation of such technology still faces hurdles: with a reduction in voltage, there is a concomitant reduction in heat generation and better insulation at the top of the reactor is required. In addition to improved insulation, the technology requires better bonding methods between TiB_{2} and the bulk graphite electrode substrate. Bonding tiles of TiB_{2} or applying composite coatings each present their own unique challenges, with the high cost and large TiB_{2} capital cost of the former and the design difficulty of the latter. Composite materials must have each component degrade at the same rate, or the wettability and thermal conductivity of the surface will be lost with active material still remaining deeper within the electrode plate.

ZrB_{2}/60%SiC composites have been used as novel conducting ceramic heaters which display high oxidation resistance and melting points, and do not display the negative temperature coefficient resistance property of pure silicon carbide. The metal-like conductance of ZrB_{2} allows for its conductivity to decrease with increasing temperature, preventing uncontrollable electrical discharge while maintaining high operational upper bounds for operation. It was also found that through incorporation of 40% ZrB_{2} flexural strength was reduced from 500 MPa and 359 MPa in SiC and ZrB_{2} single crystals to 212.96 MPa, with flexural strength highly correlated to the size of grains in the annealed ceramic material. Conductivity at 500 °C was found to be 0.005 Ω cm for the 40% SiC composite, versus 0.16 Ω cm in pure SiC.
