= Diboride =

Chemical compound containing boron with nominal composition MB2

A diboride is a boride with a nominal chemical composition of MB_{2}, where M is typically a metallic element. Diborides comprise a chemically and physically diverse group of compounds. Many metal diborides adopt layered crystal structures and exhibit combinations of properties including high melting points, hardness, electrical conductivity, chemical stability, and, in some cases, superconductivity.

Technologically important examples include titanium diboride (TiB_{2}), zirconium diboride (ZrB_{2}) and hafnium diboride (HfB_{2}), which are refractory electrically conducting ceramics; magnesium diboride (MgB_{2}), which becomes superconducting below approximately 39 K; and rhenium diboride (ReB_{2}), which is known for its high hardness.

== Crystal structure and chemical bonding ==
Many metal diborides, particularly those formed by the early transition metals, crystallize in the hexagonal AlB_{2}-type structure (Strukturbericht designation C32; space group P6/mmm). The structure consists of planar, graphite-like honeycomb layers of boron atoms alternating with hexagonal layers of metal atoms.

The physical properties of these materials arise from a combination of strong covalent B–B bonding within the boron layers, metal–boron interactions, and metallic contributions involving the metal electronic states. The relative contributions of these bonding interactions vary with the metal and affect properties such as hardness, elastic response, electrical resistivity, and thermal stability.

The AlB_{2}-type structure is particularly common among the diborides of the Group 4 and Group 5 transition metals, including TiB_{2}, ZrB_{2}, HfB_{2}, VB_{2}, NbB_{2}, and TaB_{2}. CrB_{2} also occurs in the C32 structure, whereas the boride phase chemistry of molybdenum and tungsten is more complex and includes competing compositions and crystal structures.

Not all diborides have the same structure. For example, ReB_{2} crystallizes in a different hexagonal structure, illustrating the structural diversity within the broader class of diborides.

== Transition-metal diborides ==
A technologically important class consists of refractory transition-metal diborides, particularly compounds involving Group 4–6 metals. These materials combine properties normally associated with ceramics, such as high melting temperatures, high hardness, and chemical stability, with relatively high electrical conductivity.

The Group 4 diborides TiB_{2}, ZrB_{2}, and HfB_{2} are among the most extensively investigated. ZrB_{2} and HfB_{2} are classified as ultra-high-temperature ceramics (UHTCs) and have been studied for use in extreme-temperature environments.

The properties of transition-metal diborides depend strongly on chemical composition, crystal structure, defects, grain size, texture, and secondary phases. Their layered crystal structures can also result in anisotropic mechanical and thermal properties.

== Properties ==
=== Mechanical properties ===
Several transition-metal diborides are hard refractory materials. Their mechanical properties arise in part from strong bonding within and between the boron and metal layers. Hardness and elastic properties vary considerably among different diborides and are also affected by stoichiometry, crystallographic orientation, microstructure, impurities, and processing conditions.

ReB_{2} is an example of a diboride investigated specifically as a hard and highly incompressible material. It can be synthesized at ambient pressure, unlike some other materials investigated for superhard applications.

=== Electrical properties ===
Many transition-metal diborides exhibit metallic electrical conductivity despite their ceramic-like mechanical and high-temperature properties. Their electronic structures contain contributions from both boron states and metal d states, and the electrical resistivity varies substantially between compounds.

MgB_{2} is an important exception to the primarily refractory applications of many diborides. In 2001, bulk superconductivity was reported in MgB_{2} with a superconducting transition temperature of approximately 39 K.

=== High-temperature properties ===
Refractory transition-metal diborides generally have high melting temperatures and retain useful mechanical properties at elevated temperatures. ZrB_{2} and HfB_{2}, in particular, have been extensively investigated as UHTCs for extreme-temperature applications.

Their high-temperature usefulness is nevertheless limited by oxidation. Although many transition-metal diborides have good chemical and corrosion resistance, oxidation resistance can be substantially poorer than suggested by their melting temperatures alone. Oxidation behavior therefore plays an important role in the design of diboride-based high-temperature materials.

== Synthesis and processing ==
Diboride powders can be synthesized by several routes, including direct reaction of the elements, reduction of metal oxides, carbothermal or borothermal reduction, and chemical synthesis methods. Carbothermal reduction is widely used for commercial transition-metal diboride powders.

Bulk refractory diboride ceramics are commonly consolidated using techniques such as hot pressing, spark plasma sintering, and pressureless or reactive sintering. Achieving high density can be difficult because of the strong covalent bonding and correspondingly low diffusion rates in refractory diborides.

=== Thin films ===
Transition-metal diborides are also deposited as thin films, particularly using physical vapor deposition techniques such as magnetron sputtering. Thin-film forms are of interest as hard protective coatings and as electrically conducting coatings for high-temperature environments.

Film properties depend strongly on composition, microstructure, impurities, and deposition conditions. In sputter-deposited transition-metal diborides, excess boron can segregate to grain boundaries under boron-rich growth conditions. Oxygen contamination can also significantly affect film composition, structure, and properties.

Alloying and the formation of ternary or multicomponent diborides provide additional means of modifying hardness, oxidation behavior, electrical properties, and thermal stability.

== Applications ==
The combination of refractory behavior, hardness, electrical conductivity, and chemical stability has led to the use or investigation of diborides for a range of demanding applications. Transition-metal diborides are used or studied as hard and wear-resistant coatings, cutting and wear components, high-temperature electrodes, refractory crucibles, and components exposed to molten metals.

ZrB_{2}- and HfB_{2}-based ceramics have been investigated for aerospace thermal-protection systems, rocket propulsion components, and other applications involving extreme heat fluxes and temperatures.

TiB_{2} is of technological interest because of its combination of hardness, refractory character, chemical stability, and electrical conductivity, including applications involving molten aluminium and electrically conducting ceramic components.

== Two-dimensional derivatives ==
The layered structures of AlB_{2}-type metal diborides have motivated research into their quasi-two-dimensional derivatives. Several experimental and theoretical approaches have been investigated to produce nanosheets or related structures derived from bulk metal borides. Such quasi-two-dimensional metal-boride structures are sometimes referred to as XBenes.

These materials are being investigated for applications including electrocatalysis, batteries, and supercapacitors because reducing the dimensionality can increase accessible surface area while retaining the distinctive bonding and electronic characteristics of metal borides.

== See also ==
- Boride
- Metal boride
- Ultra-high-temperature ceramic
- MAX phases
- MXenes
