= B4C =

B4C may refer to:

- Boron carbide (molecular formula B_{4}C)
- Chevrolet Camaro B4C, an automobile
