= Zirconium diboride =

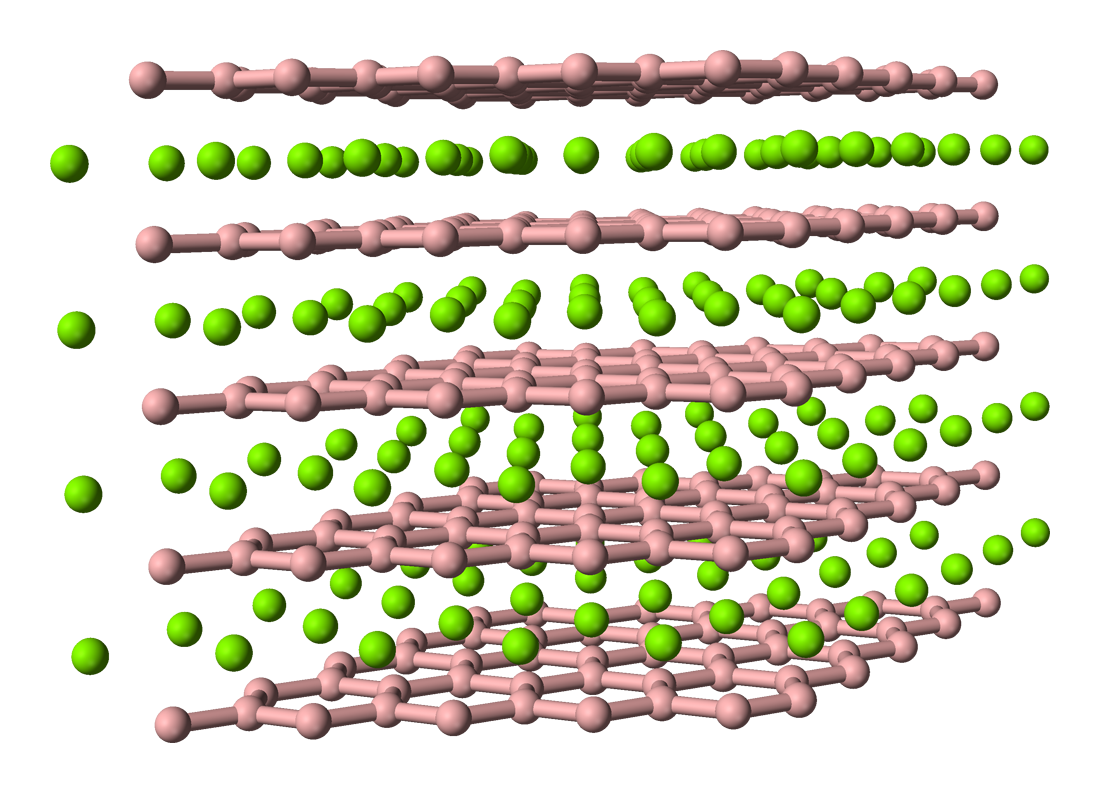

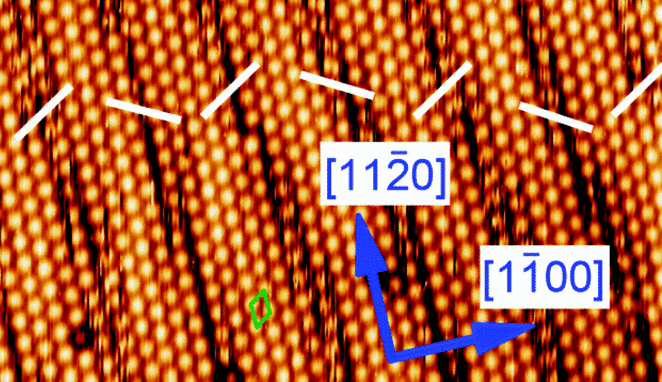
- STM image of the (2×2)-reconstructed ZrB_{2} (0001) surface

Names
- IUPAC name Zirconium diboride
- Other names ZrB_{2}

Identifiers
CAS Number	12045-64-6
ECHA InfoCard	100.031.772
PubChem CID	15787711
CompTox Dashboard (EPA)	DTXSID5065223
- InChI: InChI=1S/B2.Zr/c1-2; Key: NXBOAJHBGIROOR-UHFFFAOYSA-N

Properties
Chemical formula	ZrB_{2}
Molar mass	112.85 g/mol
Appearance	grey-black powder
Density	6.085 g/cm^{3}
Melting point	~3246 °C
Solubility in water	Insoluble

Structure
Crystal structure	Hexagonal, hP3
Space group	P6/mmm, No. 191

Hazards
- Occupational safety and health (OHS/OSH)
Main hazards	Uninvestigated
- Except where otherwise noted, data are given for materials in their standard state (at 25 °C [77 °F], 100 kPa). verify (what is ?) Infobox references

Zirconium diboride (ZrB_{2}) is a highly covalent refractory ceramic material with a hexagonal crystal structure. ZrB_{2} is an ultra-high temperature ceramic (UHTC) with a melting point of 3246 °C. This along with its relatively low density of ~6.09 g/cm^{3} (measured density may be higher due to hafnium impurities) and good high temperature strength makes it a candidate for high temperature aerospace applications such as hypersonic flight or rocket propulsion systems. It is an unusual ceramic, having relatively high thermal and electrical conductivities, properties it shares with isostructural titanium diboride and hafnium diboride.

ZrB_{2} parts are usually hot pressed (pressure applied to the heated powder) and then machined to shape. Sintering of ZrB_{2} is hindered by the material's covalent nature and presence of surface oxides which increase grain coarsening before densification during sintering. Pressureless sintering of ZrB_{2} is possible with sintering additives such as boron carbide and carbon which react with the surface oxides to increase the driving force for sintering but mechanical properties are degraded compared to hot pressed ZrB_{2}.

Additions of ~30 vol% SiC to ZrB_{2} is often added to ZrB_{2} to improve oxidation resistance through SiC creating a protective oxide layer - similar to aluminium's protective alumina layer.

ZrB_{2} is used in ultra-high temperature ceramic matrix composites (UHTCMCs).

Carbon fiber reinforced zirconium diboride composites show high toughness while silicon carbide fiber reinforced zirconium diboride composites are brittle and show a catastrophic failure.

== Preparation ==
ZrB_{2} can be synthesized by stoichiometric reaction between constituent elements, in this case Zr and B. This reaction provides for precise stoichiometric control of the materials. At 2000 K, the formation of ZrB_{2} via stoichiometric reaction is thermodynamically favorable (ΔG=−279.6 kJ mol^{−1}) and therefore, this route can be used to produce ZrB_{2} by self-propagating high-temperature synthesis (SHS). This technique takes advantage of the high exothermic energy of the reaction to cause high temperature, fast combustion reactions. Advantages of SHS include higher purity of ceramic products, increased sinterability, and shorter processing times. However, the extremely rapid heating rates can result in incomplete reactions between Zr and B, the formation of stable oxides of Zr, and the retention of porosity. Stoichiometric reactions have also been carried out by reaction of attrition milled (wearing materials by grinding) Zr and B powder (and then hot pressing at 600 °C for 6 h), and nanoscale particles have been obtained by reacting attrition milled Zr and B precursor crystallites (10 nm in size). Reduction of ZrO_{2} and HfO_{2} to their respective diborides can also be achieved via metallothermic reduction. Inexpensive precursor materials are used and reacted according to the reaction below:

ZrO_{2} + B_{2}O_{3} + 5Mg → ZrB_{2} + 5MgO

Mg is used as a reactant to allow for acid leaching of unwanted oxide products. Stoichiometric excesses of Mg and B_{2}O_{3} are often required during metallothermic reductions to consume all available ZrO_{2}. These reactions are exothermic and can be used to produce the diborides by SHS. Production of ZrB_{2} from ZrO_{2} via SHS often leads to incomplete conversion of reactants, and therefore double SHS (DSHS) has been employed by some researchers. A second SHS reaction with Mg and H_{3}BO_{3} as reactants along with the ZrB_{2}/ZrO_{2} mixture yields increased conversion to the diboride, and particle sizes of 25–40 nm at 800 °C. After metallothermic reduction and DSHS reactions, MgO can be separated from ZrB_{2} by mild acid leaching.

Synthesis of UHTCs by boron carbide reduction is one of the most popular methods for UHTC synthesis. The precursor materials for this reaction (ZrO_{2}/TiO_{2}/HfO_{2} and B_{4}C) are less expensive than those required by the stoichiometric and borothermic reactions. ZrB_{2} is prepared at greater than 1600 °C for at least 1 hour by the following reaction:

2ZrO_{2} + B_{4}C + 3C → 2ZrB_{2} + 4CO

This method requires a slight excess of boron, as some boron is oxidized during boron carbide reduction. ZrC has also been observed as a product from the reaction, but if the reaction is carried out with 20–25% excess B_{4}C, the ZrC phase disappears, and only ZrB_{2} remains. Lower synthesis temperatures (~1600 °C) produce UHTCs that exhibit finer grain sizes and better sinterability. Boron carbide must be subjected to grinding prior to the boron carbide reduction to promote oxide reduction and diffusion processes.

Boron carbide reductions can also be carried out via reactive plasma spraying if a UHTC coating is desired. Precursor or powder particles react with plasma at high temperatures (6000–15000 °C) which greatly reduces the reaction time. ZrB_{2} and ZrO_{2} phases have been formed using a plasma voltage and current of 50 V and 500 A, respectively. These coating materials exhibit uniform distribution of fine particles and porous microstructures, which increased hydrogen flow rates.

Another method for the synthesis of UHTCs is the borothermic reduction of ZrO_{2}, TiO_{2}, or HfO_{2} with B. At temperatures higher than 1600 °C, pure diborides can be obtained from this method. Due to the loss of some boron as boron oxide, excess boron is needed during borothermic reduction. Mechanical milling can lower the reaction temperature required during borothermic reduction. This is due to the increased particle mixing and lattice defects that result from decreased particle sizes of ZnO_{2} and B after milling. This method is also not very useful for industrial applications due to the loss of expensive boron as boron oxide during the reaction.

Nanocrystals of ZrB_{2}were successfully synthesized by Zoli's reaction, a reduction of ZrO_{2} with NaBH_{4} using a molar ratio M:B of 1:4 at 700 °C for 30 min under argon flow.

ZrO_{2} + 3NaBH_{4} → ZrB_{2} + 2Na(g,l) + NaBO_{2} + 6H_{2}(g)

ZrB_{2} can be prepared from solution-based synthesis methods as well, although few substantial studies have been conducted. Solution-based methods allow for low temperature synthesis of ultrafine UHTC powders. Yan et al. have synthesized ZrB_{2} powders using the inorganic-organic precursors ZrOC_{l2}•8H_{2}O, boric acid and phenolic resin at 1500 °C. The synthesized powders exhibit 200 nm crystallite size and low oxygen content (~ 1.0 wt%). ZrB_{2} preparation from polymeric precursors has also been recently investigated. ZrO_{2} and HfO_{2} can be dispersed in boron carbide polymeric precursors prior to reaction. Heating the reaction mixture to 1500 °C results in the in situ generation of boron carbide and carbon, and the reduction of ZrO_{2} to ZrB_{2} soon follows. The polymer must be stable, processable, and contain boron and carbon to be useful for the reaction. Dinitrile polymers formed from the condensation of dinitrile with decaborane satisfy these criteria.

Chemical vapor deposition can be used to prepare zirconium diboride. Hydrogen gas is used to reduce vapors of zirconium tetrachloride and boron trichloride at substrate temperatures greater than 800 °C. Recently, high-quality thin films of ZrB_{2} can also be prepared by physical vapor deposition.

== Defects and secondary phases in zirconium diboride ==
Zirconium diboride gains its high-temperature mechanical stability from the high atomic defect energies (i.e. the atoms do not deviate easily from their lattice sites). This means that the concentration of defects will remain low, even at high temperatures, preventing failure of the material.

The layered bonding between each layer is also very strong but means that the ceramic is highly anisotropic, having different thermal expansions in the 'z' <001> direction. Although the material has excellent high temperature properties, the ceramic has to be produced extremely carefully as any excess of either zirconium or boron will not be accommodated in the ZrB_{2} lattice (i.e. the material does not deviate from stoichiometry). Instead it will form extra lower melting point phases which may initiate failure under extreme conditions.

== Diffusion and transmutation in zirconium diboride ==
Zirconium diboride is also investigated as a possible material for nuclear reactor control rods due to the presence of boron.

^{10}B + n_{th} → [^{11}B] → α + ^{7}Li + 2.31 MeV.

The layered structure provides a plane for helium diffusion to occur. He is formed as a transmutation product of boron-10—it is the alpha particle in the above reaction—and will rapidly migrate through the lattice between the layers of zirconium and boron, however not in the 'z' direction. Of interest, the other transmutation product, lithium, is likely to be trapped in the boron vacancies that are produced by the boron-10 transmutation and not be released from the lattice.

== Application in solar energy sector ==
Direct absorption solar collector are being considered of great interest in combination with colloidal systems dispersed in suitable liquids. The obtained fluids are able to carry out, at the same time, the double function of volumetric solar absorbers and heat transfer media. Optical properties of ZrB_{2} have been investigated for this purpose.
