= Hot press =

Hot press may mean:

- Hot Press, a Dublin-based music and politics magazine founded in 1977
- regional name for an airing cupboard in Ireland and Scotland
- hot pressing, any form of a machine press which uses heat – in particular:
  - sintering with pressure
- Impressment during a time of national emergency
