= Tantalum nitride =

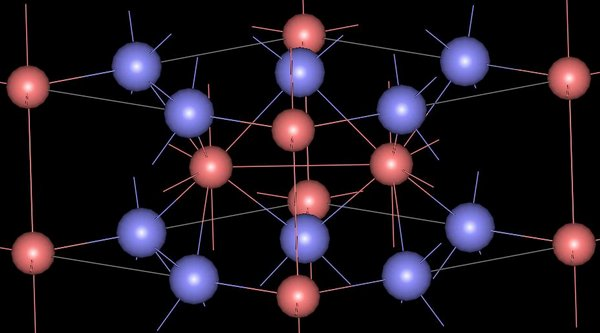

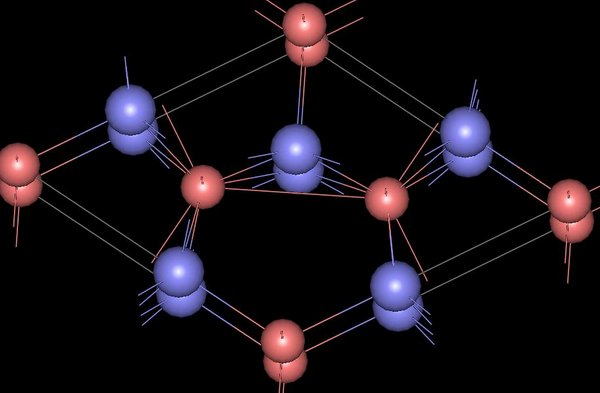

Names
- Other names Tantalum mononitride

Identifiers
CAS Number	12033-62-4
3D model (JSmol)	Interactive image
ChemSpider	74745; Ta_{3}N_{5}: 10605738
ECHA InfoCard	100.031.613
EC Number	234-788-4
PubChem CID	82832
CompTox Dashboard (EPA)	DTXSID6065183
- InChI: Key: MZLGASXMSKOWSE-UHFFFAOYSA-N; InChI=1S/N.Ta
- SMILES: N#[Ta]

Properties
Chemical formula	TaN
Molar mass	194.955 g/mol
Appearance	black crystals
Density	14.3 g/cm^{3}
Melting point	3,090 °C (5,590 °F; 3,360 K)
Solubility in water	insoluble
Thermal conductivity	1100 W/(m·K) (metallic theta phase)

Structure
Crystal structure	Hexagonal, hP6
Space group	P6̅2m, No. 189

Hazards
Flash point	Non-flammable

Related compounds
Other cations	Vanadium nitride Niobium nitride
- Except where otherwise noted, data are given for materials in their standard state (at 25 °C [77 °F], 100 kPa). verify (what is ?) Infobox references

Tantalum nitride (TaN) is a chemical compound, a nitride of tantalum. There are multiple phases of compounds, stoichimetrically from Ta_{2}N to Ta_{3}N_{5}, including TaN.

As a thin film TaN find use as a diffusion barrier and insulating layer between copper interconnects in the back end of line of computer chips. Tantalum nitrides are also used in thin film resistors.

== Phase diagram ==
The tantalum - nitrogen system includes several states including a nitrogen solid solution in Tantalum, as well as several nitride phases, which can vary from expected stoichiometry due to lattice vacancies. Annealing of nitrogen rich "TaN" can result in conversion to a two phase mixture of TaN and Ta_{5}N_{6}.

Ta_{5}N_{6} is thought to be the more thermally stable compound - though it decomposes in vacuum at 2500 °C to Ta_{2}N. It was reported the decomposition in vacuum from Ta_{3}N_{5} via Ta_{4}N_{5}, Ta_{5}N_{6}, ε-TaN, to Ta_{2}N.

θ-TaN has the highest high thermal conductivity of any metal, 1100 W/mK, nearly 3 times that of copper.

== Preparation ==
TaN is often prepared as thin films. Methods of depositing the films include RF-magnetron-reactive sputtering, Direct current (DC) sputtering, Self-propagating high-temperature synthesis (SHS) via 'combustion' of tantalum powder in nitrogen, low‐pressure metalorganic chemical vapor deposition (LP‐MOCVD), ion beam assisted deposition (IBAD), and by electron beam evaporation of tantalum in concert with high energy nitrogen ions.

Depending on the relative amount of N_{2}, the deposited film can vary from (fcc) TaN to (hexagonal) Ta_{2}N as nitrogen decreases. A variety of other phases have also been reported from deposition including bcc and hexagonal TaN; hexagonal Ta_{5}N_{6}; tetragonal Ta_{4}N_{5}; orthorhombic Ta_{6}N_{2.5}, Ta_{4}N, or Ta_{3}N_{5}. The electrical properties of TaN films vary from metallic conductor to insulator depending on the relative nitrogen ratio, with N rich films being more resistive.

== Uses ==
It is sometimes used in integrated circuit manufacture to create a diffusion barrier or "glue" layers between copper, or other electrically conductive metals. In the case of BEOL processing (at c. 20 nm), copper is first coated with tantalum, then with TaN using physical vapour deposition (PVD); this barrier coated copper is then coated with more copper by PVD, and infilled with electrolytically coated copper, before being mechanically processed (grind/polishing).

It also has application in thin film resistors. It has the advantage over nichrome resistors of forming a passivating oxide film which is resistant to moisture.
