= Strontium hexaboride =

Strontium boride
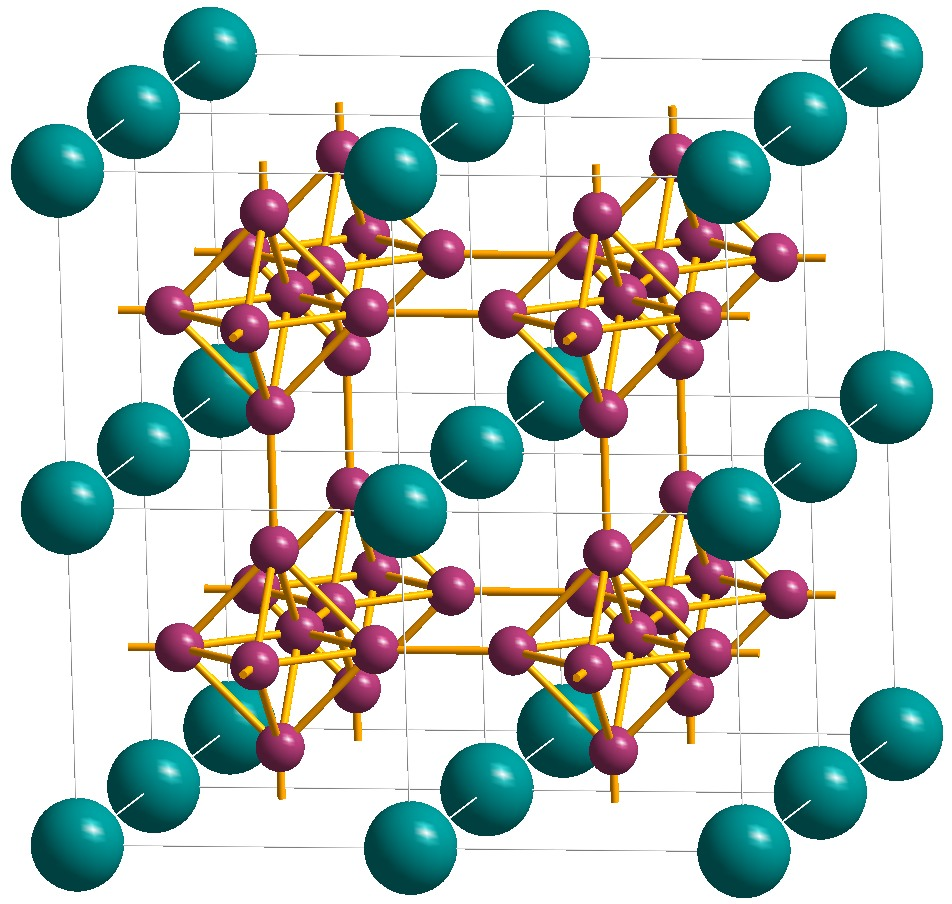
- Strontium boride

Names
- Other names strontium hexaboride

Identifiers
CAS Number	12046-54-7
3D model (JSmol)	Interactive image
ECHA InfoCard	100.031.778
EC Number	234-969-8
PubChem CID	6336904
CompTox Dashboard (EPA)	DTXSID60894982
- InChI: Key: PEZUPXKCGOMWMS-UHFFFAOYSA-N; InChI=1S/6B.Sr
- SMILES: [B].[B].[B].[B].[B].[B].[Sr]

Properties
Chemical formula	SrB_{6}
Molar mass	152.49 g/mol
Appearance	black crystalline powder
Density	3.39 g/cm^{3}, solid (15.0°C)
Melting point	2,235 °C (4,055 °F; 2,508 K)
Solubility in water	insoluble

Structure
Crystal structure	Cubic
Space group	Pm3̅m ; O_{h}

Hazards
NFPA 704 (fire diamond)	1 0 0
- Except where otherwise noted, data are given for materials in their standard state (at 25 °C [77 °F], 100 kPa). verify (what is ?) Infobox references

Strontium boride (SrB_{6}) is an inorganic compound. At room temperature, it appears as a crystalline black powder. Closer examination reveals slightly translucent dark red crystals capable of scratching quartz. It is very stable and has a high melting point and density. Although not thought to be toxic, it is an irritant to the skin, eyes, and respiratory tract.

== Magnetism ==
Strontium boride, along with other alkali-earth metal borides, has been shown to exhibit weak ferromagnetism at low temperatures. This is thought by some to be caused by slight impurities or aberrations in the crystal lattice, while others suggest different explanations are needed. Strontium boride has also been examined for semiconducting properties at lower temperatures.

== Preparation ==
In his book The Electric Furnace, Henri Moissan describes an early synthesis of strontium boride by mixing strontium borate, aluminum, and carbon in an electric furnace. Alternatively, a solid-phase synthesis of strontium boride can be carried out by reacting two moles of strontium carbonate with three moles of boron carbide and one mole of carbon inside a vacuum furnace.

== Uses ==
Strontium boride is used in insulation and nuclear control rods. A recent patent filed for aircraft windows uses SrB_{6} nanoparticles in a transparent acrylic sheet. The IR-absorbing properties of these nanoparticles prevents the transmittance of infrared wavelengths while still allowing the transmittance of visible light.
