= Barium hexaboride =

Names
- IUPAC name Barium boride
- Other names Barium hexaboride

Identifiers
CAS Number	12046-08-1
3D model (JSmol)	Interactive image
ECHA InfoCard	100.031.774
PubChem CID	6336903
CompTox Dashboard (EPA)	DTXSID501014267
- InChI: InChI=1S/6B.Ba Key: DBNPLCUZNLSUCT-UHFFFAOYSA-N
- SMILES: B#[Ba](#B)(#B)(#B)(#B)#B

Properties
Chemical formula	BaB_{6}
Molar mass	202.19 g·mol^{−1}
Appearance	Black, cubic crystals
Density	4.36 g/cm^{3}
Melting point	2,070 °C (3,760 °F; 2,340 K)
Solubility in water	Insoluble
Solubility in acids	Soluble
- Except where otherwise noted, data are given for materials in their standard state (at 25 °C [77 °F], 100 kPa). Infobox references

Barium hexaboride is a hard, black crystalline compound with a high melting point.

== Synthesis ==
It can be synthesized by passing barium vapour over boron crystals at >750 °C (1,380 °F):

Ba + 6B → BaB_{6}

It can also be synthesized by reacting barium chloride with boron in two stages: firstly at 900 °C (1,650 °F) for 30 minutes and then at 1,500 °C (2,730 °F) for 60 minutes.

== Potential applications ==
Barium hexaboride has been considered as a candidate for use in hot-cathode electron guns.
