= Hafnium diboride =

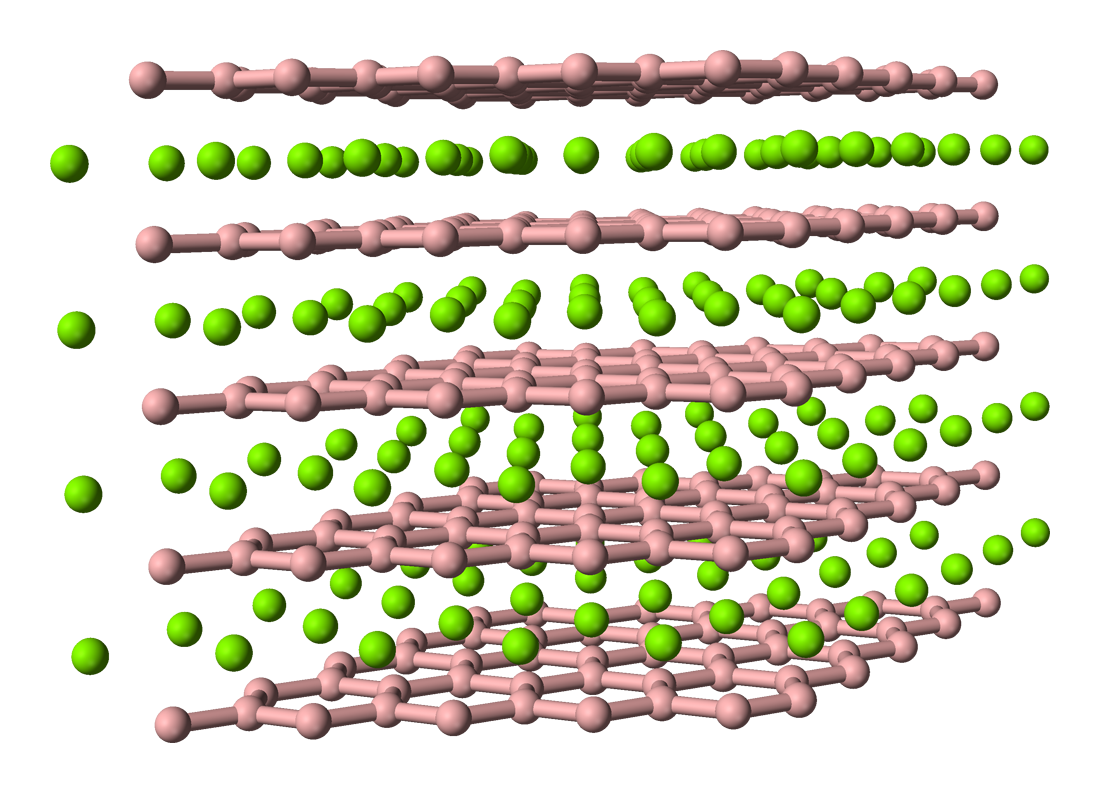

Identifiers
CAS Number	12007-23-7
3D model (JSmol)	Interactive image
ChemSpider	21241816
ECHA InfoCard	100.031.351
PubChem CID	6336857
CompTox Dashboard (EPA)	DTXSID10893925
- InChI: InChI=1S/B2.Hf/c1-2;/q+2;-2 Key: MELCCCHYSRGEEL-UHFFFAOYSA-N; InChI=1/B2.Hf/c1-2;/q+2;-2/rB2Hf/c1-2-3-1 Key: MELCCCHYSRGEEL-KRVKJWMQAC
- SMILES: B\1=B\[Hf]/1

Properties
Chemical formula	HfB_{2}
Molar mass	200.11 g/mol
Density	11.2 g/cm^{3}
Melting point	ca. 3,250 °C (5,880 °F; 3,520 K)

Structure
Crystal structure	Hexagonal, hP3
Space group	P6/mmm, No. 191
- Except where otherwise noted, data are given for materials in their standard state (at 25 °C [77 °F], 100 kPa). verify (what is ?) Infobox references

Hafnium diboride is a type of ceramic composed of hafnium and boron that belongs to the class of ultra-high temperature ceramics. It has a melting temperature of about 3250 °C. It is an unusual ceramic, having relatively high thermal and electrical conductivities, properties it shares with isostructural titanium diboride and zirconium diboride. It is a grey, metallic looking material. Hafnium diboride has a hexagonal crystal structure, a molar mass of 200.11 grams per mole, and a density of 11.2 g/cm^{3}.

Hafnium diboride is often combined with carbon, boron, silicon, silicon carbide, and/or nickel to improve the consolidation of the hafnium diboride powder (sintering). It is commonly formed into a solid by a process called hot pressing, where the powders are pressed together using both heat and pressure.

The material has potential for use in hypervelocity reentry vehicles such as ICBM heat shields or aerodynamic leading-edges, due to its strength and thermal properties. Unlike polymer and composite materials, HfB_{2} can be formed into aerodynamic shapes that will not ablate during reentry.

Hafnium diboride is also investigated as a possible new material for nuclear reactor control rods. It is also being investigated as a microchip diffusion barrier. If synthesized correctly, the barrier can be less than 7 nm in thickness.

Nanocrystals of HfB_{2} with rose-like morphology were obtained combining HfO_{2} and NaBH_{4} at 700-900°C under argon flow:

HfO_{2} + 3NaBH_{4} → HfB_{2} + 2Na(g,l) + NaBO_{2} + 6H_{2}(g)
