= Titanium diboride =

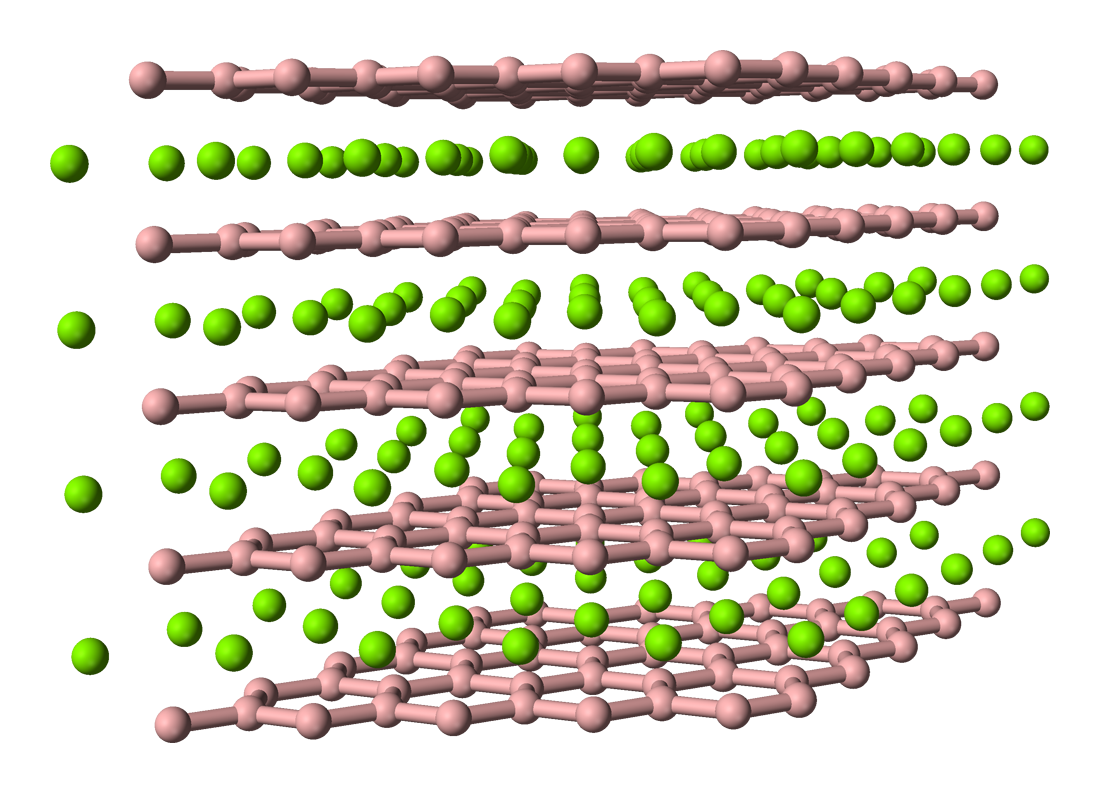

Identifiers
CAS Number	12045-63-5
3D model (JSmol)	Interactive image
ChemSpider	21171261
ECHA InfoCard	100.031.771
EC Number	234-961-4
PubChem CID	11412340
CompTox Dashboard (EPA)	DTXSID00190718
- InChI: InChI=1S/B2.Ti/c1-2; Key: TXVDUUNOLJOZCR-UHFFFAOYSA-N
- SMILES: [B].[Ti].[B]

Properties
Chemical formula	TiB_{2}
Molar mass	69.489 g/mol
Appearance	non lustrous metallic grey
Density	4.52 g/cm^{3}
Melting point	3,230 °C (5,850 °F; 3,500 K)

Structure
Crystal structure	Hexagonal, hP1
Space group	P6/mmm
Lattice constant	a = 302.36 pm, c = 322.04 pm
- Except where otherwise noted, data are given for materials in their standard state (at 25 °C [77 °F], 100 kPa). verify (what is ?) Infobox references

Titanium diboride (TiB_{2}) is an extremely hard ceramic which has excellent heat conductivity, oxidation stability and wear resistance. TiB_{2} is also a reasonable electrical conductor, so it can be used as a cathode material in aluminium smelting and can be shaped by electrical discharge machining.

== Physical properties ==
TiB_{2} shares some properties with boron carbide and titanium carbide, but many of its properties are superior to those two.

=== Exceptional hardness at extreme temperature ===
- 2nd hardest material at 3000°C (diamond)
- 3rd hardest material at 2800°C (cBN)
- 4th hardest material at 2100°C (B_{4}C)
- 5th hardest material at 1000°C (B_{6}O)

=== Advantages over other borides ===
- Highest boride elastic modulus
- Highest boride fracture toughness
- Highest boride compressive strength
- 3rd highest boride melting point (3230 °C) (HfB_{2})

=== Other advantages ===
- High thermal conductivity (60-120 W/(m K)),
- High electrical conductivity (~10^{5} S/cm)

=== Drawbacks ===
- Difficult to mold due to high melting temperature
- Difficult to sinter due to the high covalent bonding
- Limited to pressing to small Monolithic pieces using of spark plasma sintering

== Chemical properties ==
With respect to chemical stability, TiB_{2} is more stable in contact with pure iron than tungsten carbide or silicon nitride.

TiB_{2} is resistant to oxidation in air at temperatures up to 1100 °C, and to hydrochloric and hydrofluoric acids, but reacts with alkalis, nitric acid and sulfuric acid.

== Production ==
TiB_{2} does not occur naturally in the earth. Titanium diboride powder can be prepared by a variety of high-temperature methods, such as the direct reactions of titanium or its oxides/hydrides, with elemental boron over 1000 °C, carbothermal reduction by thermite reaction of titanium oxide and boron oxide, or hydrogen reduction of boron halides in the presence of the metal or its halides. Among various synthesis routes, electrochemical synthesis and solid state reactions have been developed to prepare finer titanium diboride in large quantity. An example of solid state reaction is the borothermic reduction, which can be illustrated by the following reactions:

(1) 2 TiO_{2} + B_{4}C + 3C → 2 TiB_{2} + 4 CO

(2) TiO_{2} + 3NaBH_{4} → TiB_{2} + 2Na_{(g,l)} + NaBO_{2} + 6H_{2(g)}

The first synthesis route (1), however, cannot produce nanosized powders. Nanocrystalline (5–100 nm) TiB_{2} was synthesized using the reaction (2) or the following techniques:

- Solution phase reaction of NaBH_{4} and TiCl_{4}, followed by annealing the amorphous precursor obtained at 900–1100 °C.
- Mechanical alloying of a mixture of elemental Ti and B powders.
- Self-propagating high-temperature synthesis process involving addition of varying amounts of NaCl.
- Milling assisted self-propagating high-temperature synthesis (MA-SHS).
- Solvothermal reaction in benzene of metallic sodium with amorphous boron powder and TiCl_{4} at 400 °C:

TiCl_{4} + 2 B + 4 Na → TiB_{2} + 4 NaCl

Many TiB_{2} applications are inhibited by economic factors, particularly the costs of densifying a high melting point material - the melting point is about 2970 °C, and, thanks to a layer of titanium dioxide that forms on the surface of the particles of a powder, it is very resistant to sintering. Admixture of about 10% silicon nitride facilitates the sintering, though sintering without silicon nitride has been demonstrated as well.

Thin films of TiB_{2} can be produced by several techniques. The electroplating of TiB_{2} layers possess two main advantages compared with physical vapor deposition or chemical vapor deposition: the growing rate of the layer is 200 times higher (up to 5 μm/s) and the inconveniences of covering complex shaped products are dramatically reduced.

== Potential applications ==
Current use of TiB_{2} appears to be limited to specialized applications in such areas as impact resistant armor, cutting tools, crucibles, neutron absorbers and wear resistant coatings.

TiB_{2} is extensively used for evaporation boats for vapour coating of aluminium. It is an attractive material for the aluminium industry as an inoculant to refine the grain size when casting aluminium alloys, because of its wettability by and low solubility in molten aluminium and good electrical conductivity.

Thin films of TiB_{2} can be used to provide wear and corrosion resistance to a cheap and/or tough substrate.

== Compare ==
- Magnesium diboride

== See also ==
- Boride
- Diboride
- Titanium carbide
- Cermet
- Sintering
- Hot pressing
