= Tantalum boride =

Compounds of tantalum and boron

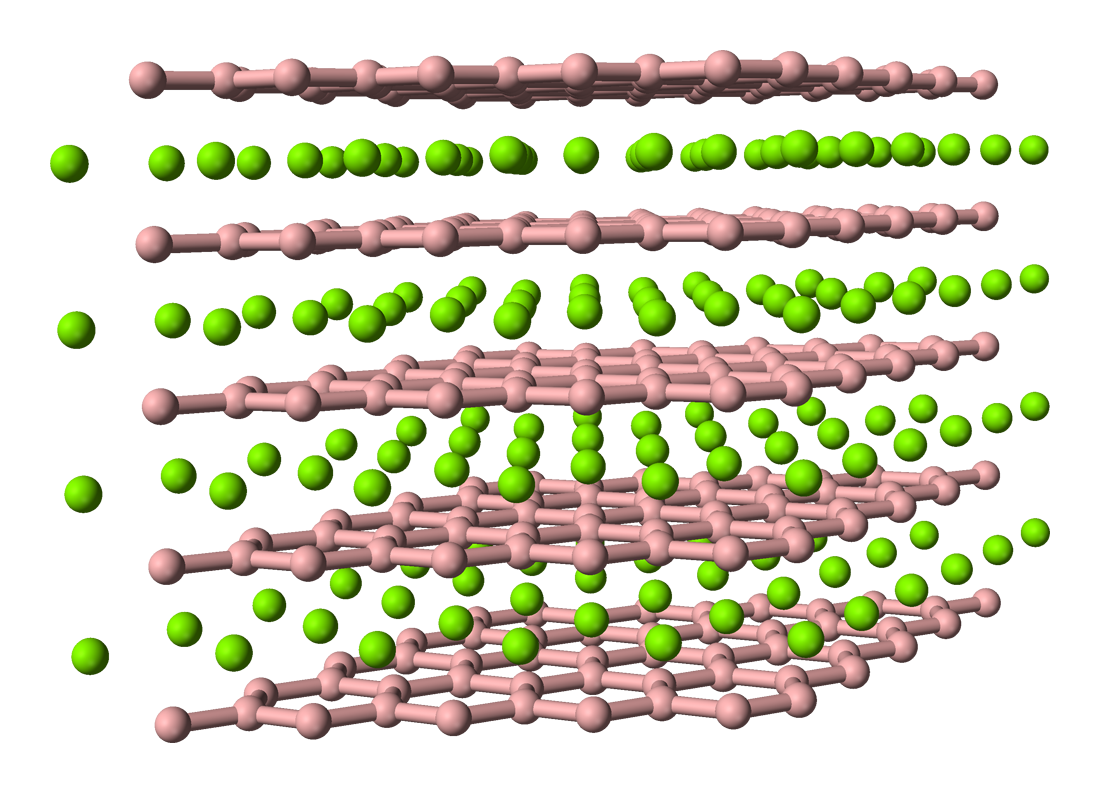
Structure of TaB_{2}

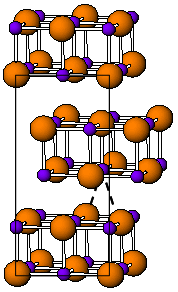
Structure of TaB

Tantalum borides are compounds of tantalum and boron most remarkable for their extreme hardness.

== Properties ==
The Vickers hardness of TaB and TaB_{2} films and crystals is ~30 GPa. Those materials are stable to oxidation below 700 °C and to acid corrosion.

TaB_{2} has the same hexagonal structure as most diborides (AlB_{2}, MgB_{2}, etc.). The mentioned borides have the following space groups: TaB (orthorhombic, Thallium(I) iodide-type, Cmcm), Ta_{5}B_{6} (Cmmm), Ta_{3}B_{4} (Immm), TaB_{2} (hexagonal, aluminum diboride-type, P6/mmm).

== Preparation ==
Single crystals of TaB, Ta_{5}B_{6}, Ta_{3}B_{4} or TaB_{2} (about 1 cm diameter, 6 cm length) can be produced by the floating zone method.

Tantalum boride films can be deposited from a gas mixture of TaCl_{5}-BCl_{3}-H_{2}-Ar in the temperature range 540–800 °C. TaB_{2} (single-phase) is deposited at a source gas flow ratio (BCl_{3}/TaCl_{5}) of six and a temperature above 600 °C. TaB (single-phase) is deposited at BCl_{3}/TaCl_{5} = 2–4 and T = 600–700 °C.

Nanocrystals of TaB_{2} were successfully synthesized by the reduction of Ta_{2}O_{5} with NaBH_{4} using a molar ratio M:B of 1:4 at 700-900 °C for 30 min under argon flow.

Ta_{2}O_{5} + 6.5 NaBH_{4} → 2 TaB_{2} + 4 Na(g,l) + 2.5 NaBO_{2}+ 13 H_{2}(g)
