= Self-propagating high-temperature synthesis =

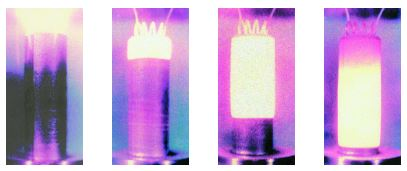

Self-propagating high-temperature synthesis (SHS) is a method for producing both inorganic and organic compounds by exothermic combustion reactions in solids of different nature. Reactions can occur between a solid reactant coupled with either a gas, liquid, or other solid. If the reactants, intermediates, and products are all solids, it is known as a solid flame. If the reaction occurs between a solid reactant and a gas phase reactant, it is called infiltration combustion. Since the process occurs at high temperatures, the method is ideally suited for the production of refractory materials including powders, metallic alloys, or ceramics.

The modern SHS process was reported and patented in 1971, although some SHS-like processes were known previously.

== Advantages and Disadvantages ==
Self-propagating high-temperature synthesis is a green synthesis technique that is highly energy efficient, using little if any toxic solvents. There have been environmental analysis conducted to show that SHS has a lesser environmental impact than traditional solution-phase processing techniques. The technique uses less energy for production of materials, and the energy cost savings increase as synthesis batch sizes increase.

SHS is not a suitable technique for production of nanoparticles. Typically, the high-temperature nature of the process leads to particle sintering during and after the reaction. The high-temperatures generated during synthesis also lead to problems with energy dissipation and suitable reaction vessels, however, some systems use this excess heat to drive other plant-processes.

== Methodology ==
In its usual format, SHS is conducted starting from finely powdered reactants that are intimately mixed. In some cases, the reagents are finely powdered whereas in other cases, they are sintered to minimize their surface area and prevent uninitiated exothermic reactions, which can be dangerous. In other cases, the particles are mechanically activated through techniques such as high energy ball milling (e.g. in a planetary mill), which results in nanocomposite particles that contain both reactants within individual chemical cells. After reactant preparation, synthesis is initiated by point-heating of a small part (usually the top) of the sample. Once started, a wave of exothermic reaction sweeps through the remaining material. SHS has also been conducted with thin films, liquids, gases, powder–liquid systems, gas suspensions, layered systems, gas-gas systems, and others. Reactions have been conducted in a vacuum and under both inert or reactive gases. The temperature of the reaction can be moderated by the addition of inert salt that absorbs heat in the process of melting or evaporation, such as sodium chloride, or by adding "chemical oven"—a highly exothermic mixture—to decrease the ratio of cooling.

== Examples ==
The reaction of alkali metal chalcogenides (S, Se, Te) and pnictides (N, P, As) with other metal halides produce the corresponding metal chalcogenides and pnictides. The synthesis of gallium nitride from gallium triiodide and lithium nitride is illustrative:

GaI_{3} + Li_{3}N → GaN + 3 LiI

The process is so exothermic (ΔH = -515 kJ/mol) that the LiI evaporates, leaving a residue of GaN. With GaCl_{3} in place of GaI_{3}, the reaction is so exothermic that the product GaN decomposes. Thus, the selection of the metal halide affects the success of the method.

Other compounds prepared by this method include metal dichalcogenides such as MoS_{2}. The reaction is conducted in a stainless steel reactor with excess Na_{2}S.

Self-propagating high-temperature synthesis can also be conducted in an artificial high gravity environment to control the phase composition of products.

SHS has been used to vitrify various nuclear waste streams including ashes from incineration, spent inorganic ion exchangers such as clinoptilolite and contaminated soils.

== Reaction Kinetics ==
Due to the solid-state nature of SHS processes, it is possible to measure reaction kinetics in-situ using a variety of experimental techniques, including electrothermal explosion, differential thermal analysis, combustion velocity approaches, among others. There have been a variety of systems studied, including intermetallic, thermite, carbides, and others. Using SHS, it was shown that the particle size has a significant effect on the reaction kinetics. It was further shown that these effects are related to the relationship between the surface area/volume ratio of the particles, and that the kinetics can be controlled via high-energy ball-milling. Depending on the morphology of the reactants, it is possible to initiate a SHS reaction where a liquid phase occurs prior to phase formation or to directly result in solid-phase products without any melt.
