= Hot pressing =

Powder metallurgy process

Hot pressing is a high-pressure, low-strain-rate powder metallurgy process for forming of a powder or powder compact at a temperature high enough to induce sintering and creep processes. This is achieved by the simultaneous application of heat and pressure.

Hot pressing is mainly used to fabricate hard and brittle materials. One large use is in the consolidation of diamond-metal composite cutting tools and technical ceramics. The densification works through particle rearrangement and plastic flow at the particle contacts. The loose powder or the pre-compacted part is in most of the cases filled to a graphite mould that allows induction or resistance heating up to temperatures of typically 2,400 °C (4,350 °F). Pressures of up to 50 MPa (7,300 psi) can be applied. Other great use is in the pressing of different types of polymers, but this is done with lower temperatures and pressures such as those found in the open source hot press.

Within hot pressing technology, three distinctly different types of heating can be found in use: induction heating, indirect resistance heating and field assisted sintering technique (FAST) / direct hot pressing.

== Inductive heating ==
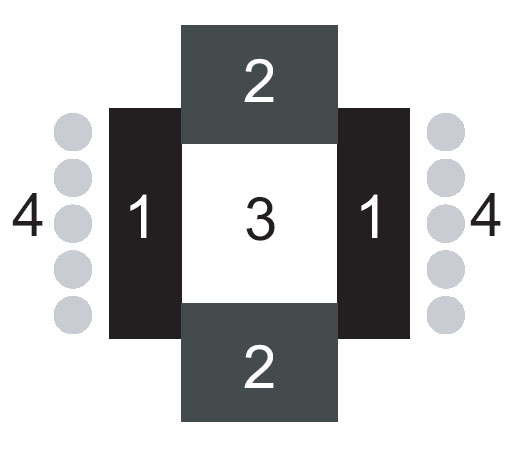
Figure I: Conventional inductive heating

In this process heat is produced within the mould when it is subjected to a high frequency electromagnetic field, generated by using an induction coil coupled to an electronic generator. The mold is made out of graphite or steel, and pressure is applied by one or two cylinders onto the punches. The mold is positioned within the induction coil. The advantage here is that the pressure and the inductive power are completely independent. Even powders with a liquid phase are amenable to this process and low pressures are possible, too. Among the disadvantages are the expense of a high-frequency generator and the need for proper alignment. If the mold is placed off centre, the heat distribution is uneven. But the main disadvantage is the dependence of the process on good inductive coupling and thermal conductivity of the mold. The magnetic field can penetrate the mold only 0.5mm to 3mm. From there on, the heat has to be "transported" into the mold by the thermal conductivity of the mould material. Uniform heating is much more difficult if the air gap between the mold and the inductive coil is not the same all along the mould profile. Another potential problem is heating rate. Too high a heat up rate will result in high temperature differences between the surface and core that can destroy the mold.

== Indirect resistance heating ==
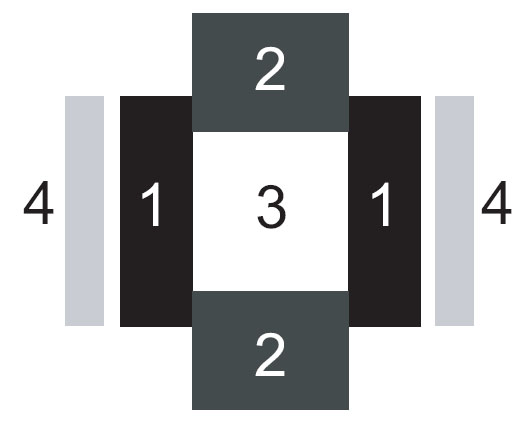
Figure II: Indirect resistance heating

With indirect resistance heating technology, the mold is placed in a heating chamber. The chamber is heated by graphite heating elements. These elements are heated by electric current. The heat is then transferred into the mold by convection. As the electrical energy heats the heating elements that then heat the mold in a secondary manner, the process is called indirect resistance heating.

Advantages are high achievable temperatures, independent from the conductivity of the mold and independent from heat and pressure. Main disadvantage is the time that it takes to heat up the mold. It takes relatively long for heat transfer to take place from the furnace atmosphere to the mold surface and subsequently throughout the cross-section of the mold.

== Field assisted sintering technique (FAST) / spark plasma sintering (SPS) ==
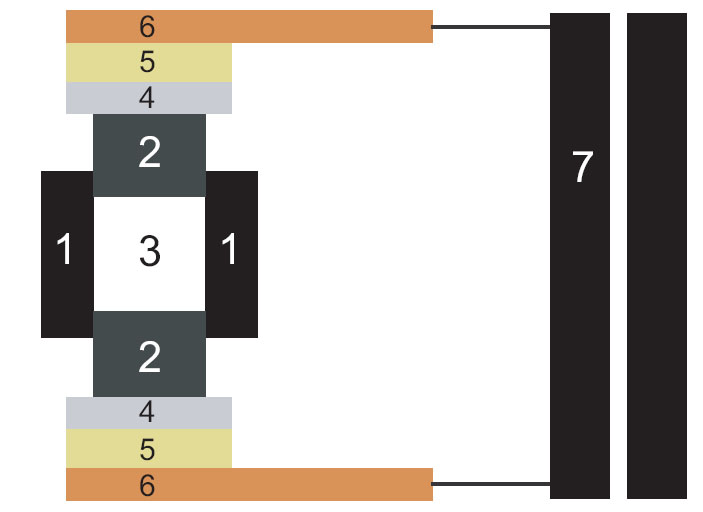
Figure III: Direct hot pressing

The basic idea of sintering with electric current going through the mold is quite old. Resistance heating of cemented carbide powders was patented by Tayler as early as 1933. This method is currently undergoing renewed interest. Current can be pulsed or unpulsed DC or AC. Spark plasma sintering (SPS) is a common name for this technique, however, it is technically incorrect since no spark and no plasma have been validated so far. Other common names for this technique are Direct Current Sintering, Rapid Hot Pressing, Direct Hot Pressing, amongst others. All these techniques are summarized under the generic term "Field Assisted Sintering Technique (FAST)".

The compelling reason for shortening the cycle time then was to avoid grain growth and also save energy. In direct hot pressing, the mold is directly connected to electrical power. The resistivity of the mold and the powder part generates the heat directly in the mold. This results in very high heating rates. Additionally, this leads to significant increase in the sintering activity of fine metal powder aggregates which makes short cycle times of a few minutes possible. Further, this process lowers the threshold sintering temperature and pressure compared to that required in conventional sintering processes. The previous two methods are both closely dependent on an intrinsic property of the mold material, i.e., its thermal conductivity. With direct resistance heating, however, the heat is generated where it is needed.

Latest research suggests that there is no basic difference between sintering with pulsed or unpulsed current (SPS or FAST). In principle the same improved sinter results (compared to conventional hot pressing) can be achieved by all direct hot pressing techniques, if the improvement is only due to the in-situ heating of the powder. If additional physical effects are present, which are associated to the electrical current density itself (which is highly dependent on the powder type), a pulsed current frequently has additional beneficial effects, because during each pulse the electrical current density peaks to a value significantly higher than a DC current with comparable heating power.

== Applications ==
Recently, the manufacture of such critical items as sputtering targets and high-performance ceramic components, such as boron carbide, titanium diboride, and sialon, have been achieved. Using metal powder, the conductivity of the mold is ideal for fast heating of the work-piece. Molds with a large diameter and relatively small height can be heated quickly. The process is especially suitable for applications requiring high heating rates. This applies to materials that can only be held at high temperatures briefly, or for processes requiring rapid heating rates for high productivity.

With direct hot pressing technology, materials can be sintered to their final density. The near net-shape precision achieved is very high and often eliminates mechanical reworking of materials that are often difficult to process.

In the friction material industry, direct hot pressing plays an increasing role in production of sintered brake pads and clutches. Sintered brake pads are increasingly used for high speed train and motorcycle applications, as well as wind energy, ATVs, mountain bikes and industrial applications. Sintered clutch discs are predominantly used for heavy-duty trucks, vessels, tractors and other agricultural machines.

Research facilities such as universities and institutes take advantage of the short sinter cycles, which speeds the research process.

Recent development work includes metal-diamond-composite heat sinks, for example in LED and laser applications. Sintering metal-diamond compounds with direct hot presses goes back to the 1950s since when it is commonly practised in the diamond tool industry.

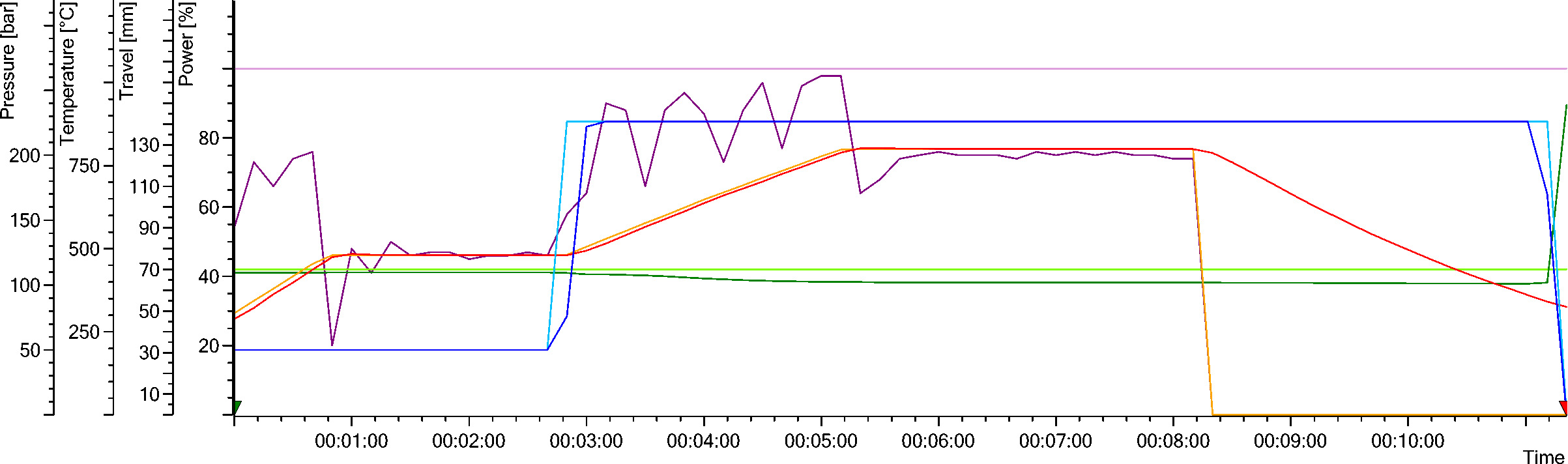
Figure IV: Process layout of the co-sintering process; total cycle time 11.5 mins Key: Red/orange line: actual/set temperature Green line: densification of powder/green compact Dark blue/light blue: actual/set pressure
