= Boron carbide =

Extremely hard ceramic compound

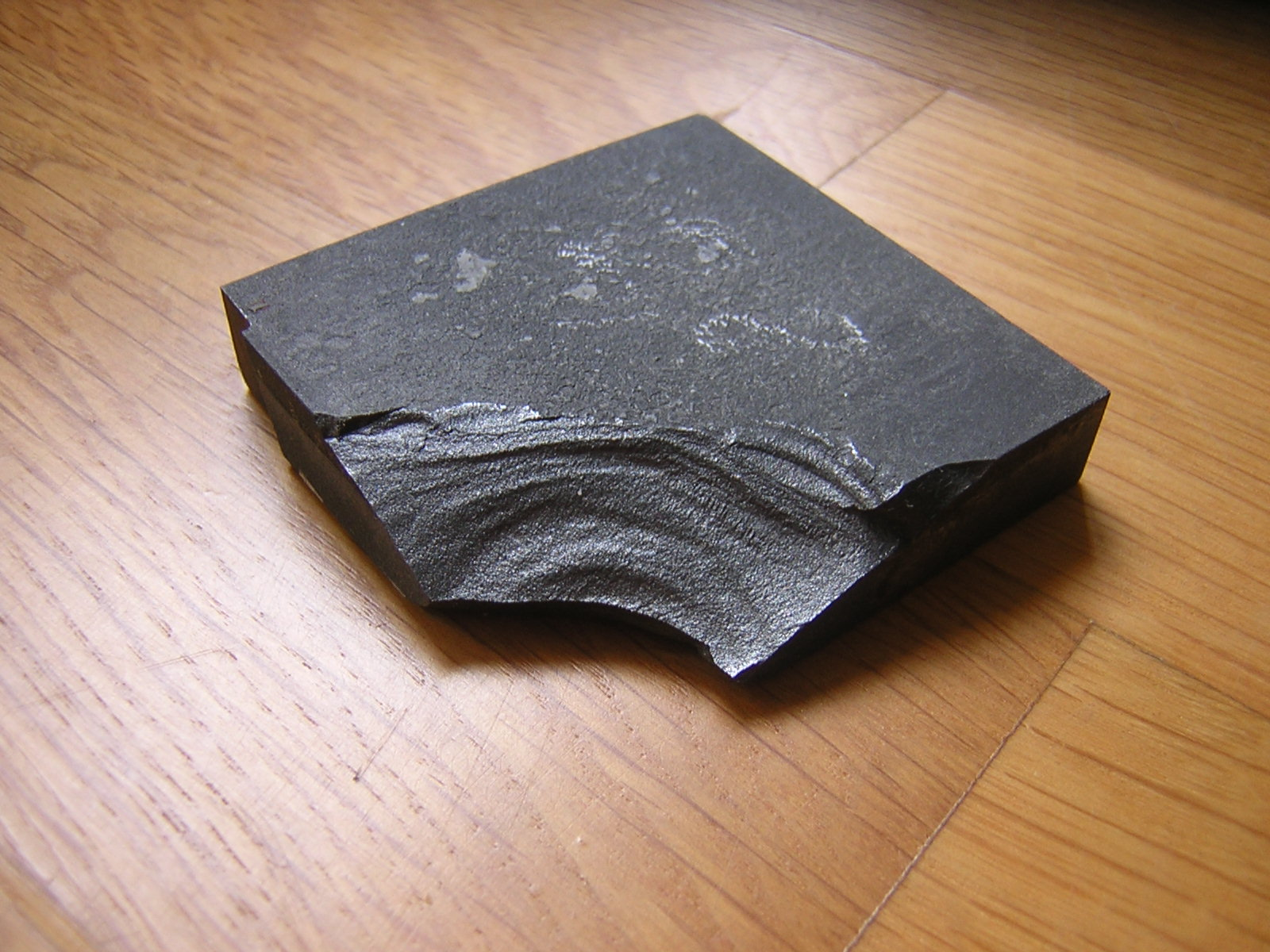
- Boron carbide

Names
- IUPAC name Boron carbide
- Other names Tetrabor

Identifiers
CAS Number	12069-32-8
3D model (JSmol)	Interactive image
ChemSpider	109889
ECHA InfoCard	100.031.907
PubChem CID	123279
UNII	T5V24LJ508
CompTox Dashboard (EPA)	DTXSID4051615
- InChI: InChI=1S/CB4/c2-1-3(2)5(1)4(1)2 Key: INAHAJYZKVIDIZ-UHFFFAOYSA-N; InChI=1/CB4/c2-1-3(2)5(1)4(1)2 Key: INAHAJYZKVIDIZ-UHFFFAOYAS
- SMILES: B12B3B4B1C234

Properties
Chemical formula	B_{4}C
Molar mass	55.255 g/mol
Appearance	dark gray or black powder, odorless
Density	2.50 g/cm^{3}, solid.
Melting point	2,350 °C (4,260 °F; 2,620 K)
Boiling point	>3500 °C
Solubility in water	insoluble

Structure
Crystal structure	Rhombohedral

Hazards
Safety data sheet (SDS)	External MSDS

Related compounds
Related compounds	Boron nitride
- Except where otherwise noted, data are given for materials in their standard state (at 25 °C [77 °F], 100 kPa). verify (what is ?) Infobox references

Boron carbide (chemical formula approximately B_{4}C) is an extremely hard boron–carbon ceramic, a covalent material used in tank armor, bulletproof vests, engine sabotage powders, as well as numerous industrial applications. With a Vickers hardness of >30 GPa, it is one of the hardest known materials, behind cubic boron nitride and diamond.

== History ==
Boron carbide was first noticed by Henri Moissan (Nobel Prize of chemistry in 1906) in 1894 as a by-product of reactions involving metal borides, but its chemical formula was unknown. It was not until the 1930s that the chemical composition was estimated as B_{4}C. Controversy remained as to whether or not the material had this exact 4:1 stoichiometry, as, in practice the material is always slightly carbon-deficient with regard to this formula, and X-ray crystallography shows that its structure is highly complex, with a mixture of C-B-C chains and B_{12} icosahedra.

These features argued against a very simple exact B_{4}C empirical formula. Because of the B_{12} structural unit, the chemical formula of "ideal" boron carbide is often written not as B_{4}C, but as B_{12}C_{3}, and the carbon deficiency of boron carbide described in terms of a combination of the B_{12}C_{3} and B_{12}CBC units.

== Crystal structure ==
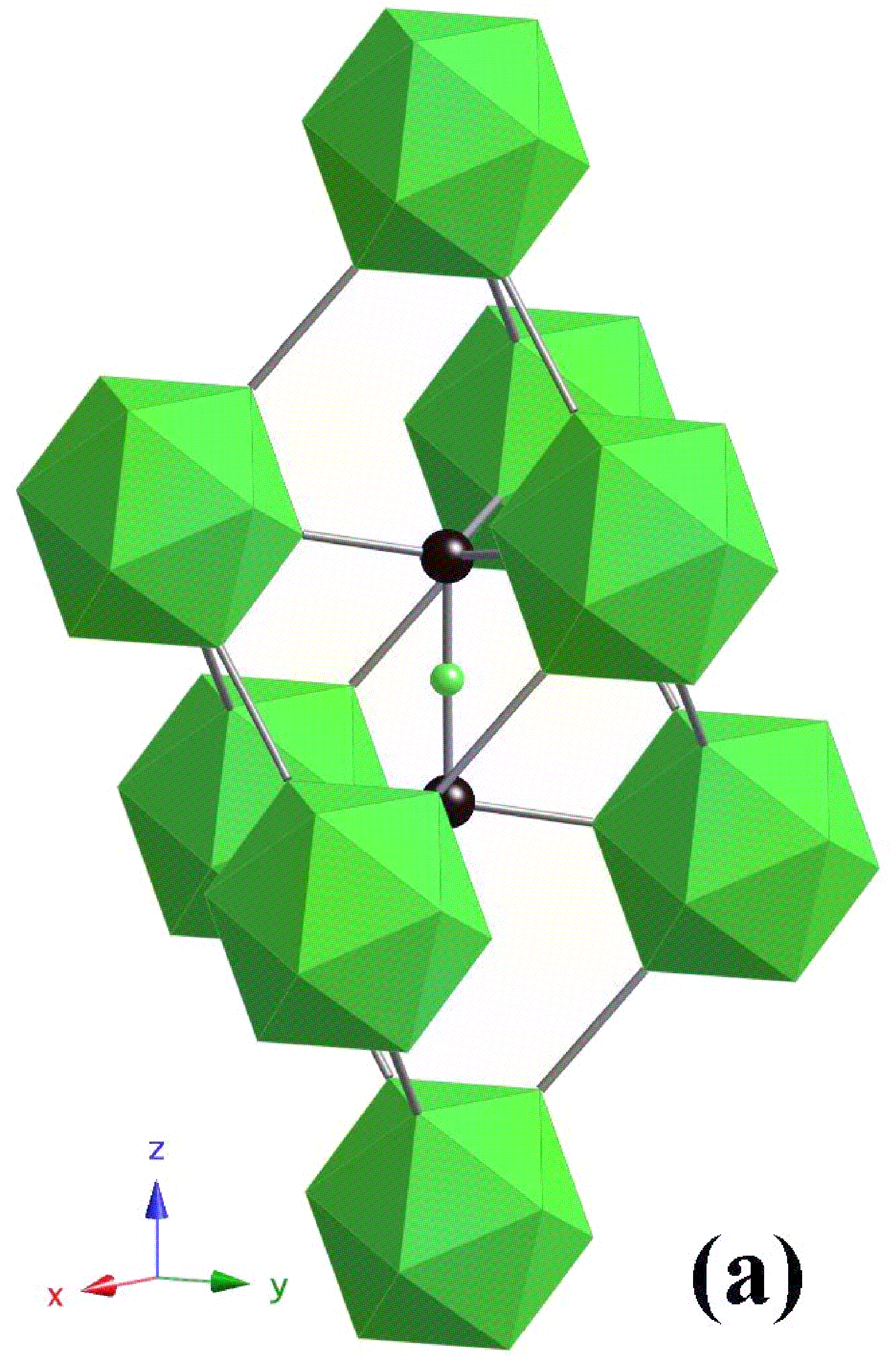
Unit cell of B_{4}C. The green sphere and icosahedra consist of boron atoms, and black spheres are carbon atoms.

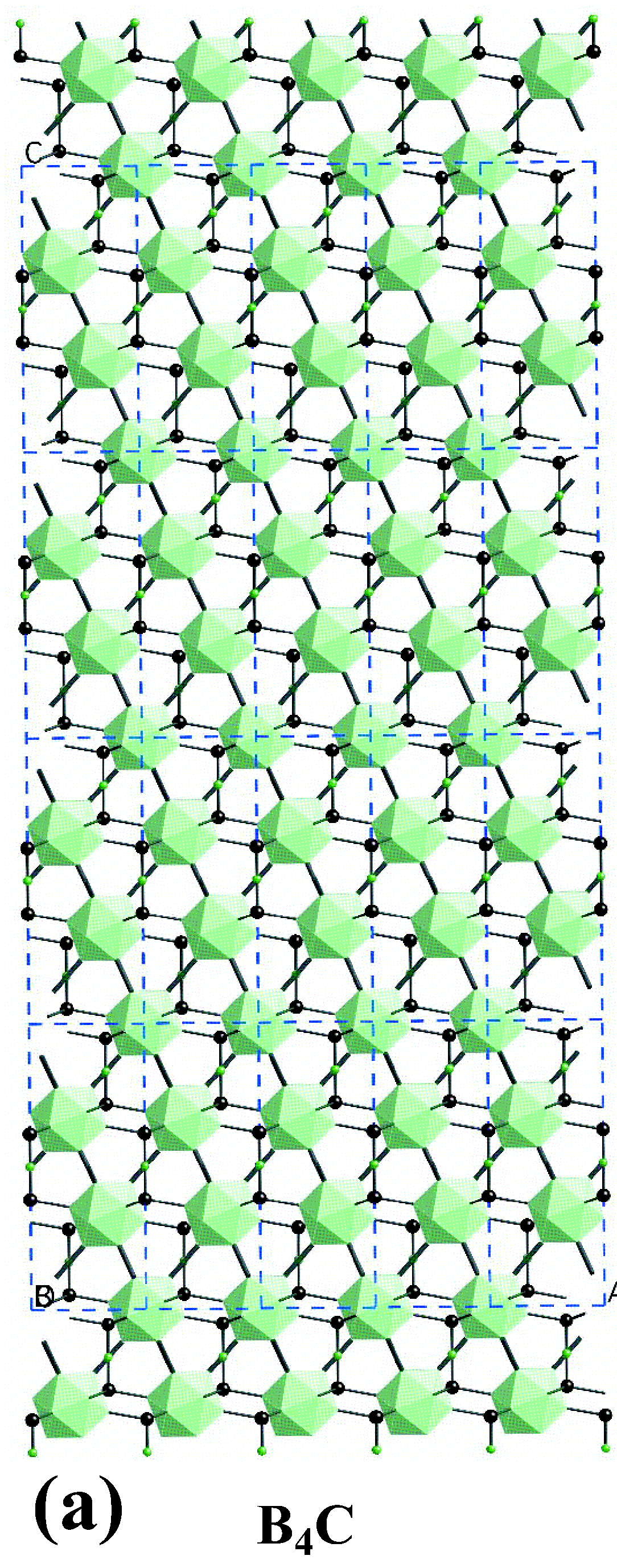
Fragment of the B_{4}C crystal structure.

Boron carbide has a complex crystal structure typical of icosahedron-based borides. There, B_{12} icosahedra form a rhombohedral lattice unit (space group: R3̅m (No. 166), lattice constants: a = 0.56 nm and c = 1.212 nm) surrounding a C-B-C chain that resides at the center of the unit cell, and both carbon atoms bridge the neighboring three icosahedra. This structure is layered: the B_{12} icosahedra and bridging carbons form a network plane that spreads parallel to the c-plane and stacks along the c-axis. The lattice has two basic structure units – the B_{12} icosahedron and the B_{6} octahedron. Because of the small size of the B_{6} octahedra, they cannot interconnect. Instead, they bond to the B_{12} icosahedra in the neighboring layer, and this decreases bonding strength in the c-plane.

Because of the B_{12} structural unit, the chemical formula of "ideal" boron carbide is often written not as B_{4}C, but as B_{12}C_{3}, and the carbon deficiency of boron carbide described in terms of a combination of the B_{12}C_{3} and B_{12}C_{2} units. Some studies indicate the possibility of incorporation of one or more carbon atoms into the boron icosahedra, giving rise to formulas such as (B_{11}C)CBC = B_{4}C at the carbon-heavy end of the stoichiometry, but formulas such as B_{12}(CBB) = B_{14}C at the boron-rich end. "Boron carbide" is thus not a single compound, but a family of compounds of different compositions. A common intermediate, which approximates a commonly found ratio of elements, is B_{12}(CBC) = B_{6.5}C. Quantum mechanical calculations have demonstrated that configurational disorder between boron and carbon atoms on the different positions in the crystal determines several of the materials properties – in particular, the crystal symmetry of the B_{4}C composition and the non-metallic electrical character of the B_{13}C_{2} composition.

== Properties ==
Boron carbide is known as a robust material having extremely high hardness (about 9.5 up to 9.75 on Mohs hardness scale), high cross section for absorption of neutrons (i.e. good shielding properties against neutrons), stability to ionizing radiation and most chemicals. Its Vickers hardness (38 GPa), elastic modulus (460 GPa) and fracture toughness (3.5 MPa·m^{1/2}) approach the corresponding values for diamond (1150 GPa and 5.3 MPa·m^{1/2}).

As of 2015, boron carbide is the third hardest substance known, after diamond and cubic boron nitride, earning it the nickname "black diamond".

Under high-impact loading, boron carbide can undergo localized amorphization. High-resolution electron microscopy of shock-loaded specimens has revealed nanoscale amorphous bands within the grains, associated with fracture surfaces. This damage mechanism has been linked to a decrease in ballistic performance at high impact rates and pressures.

=== Semiconductor properties ===
Boron carbide is a semiconductor, with electronic properties dominated by hopping-type transport. The energy band gap depends on composition as well as the degree of order. The band gap is estimated at 2.09 eV, with multiple mid-bandgap states which complicate the photoluminescence spectrum. The material is typically p-type.

== Preparation ==
Boron carbide was first synthesized by Henri Moissan in 1894 by reduction of boron trioxide either with carbon or magnesium in presence of carbon in an electric arc furnace. In the case of carbon, the reaction occurs at temperatures above the melting point of B_{4}C and is accompanied by liberation of large amount of carbon monoxide:

2 B_{2}O_{3} + 7 C → B_{4}C + 6 CO

If magnesium is used, the reaction can be carried out in a graphite crucible, and the magnesium byproducts are removed by treatment with acid.

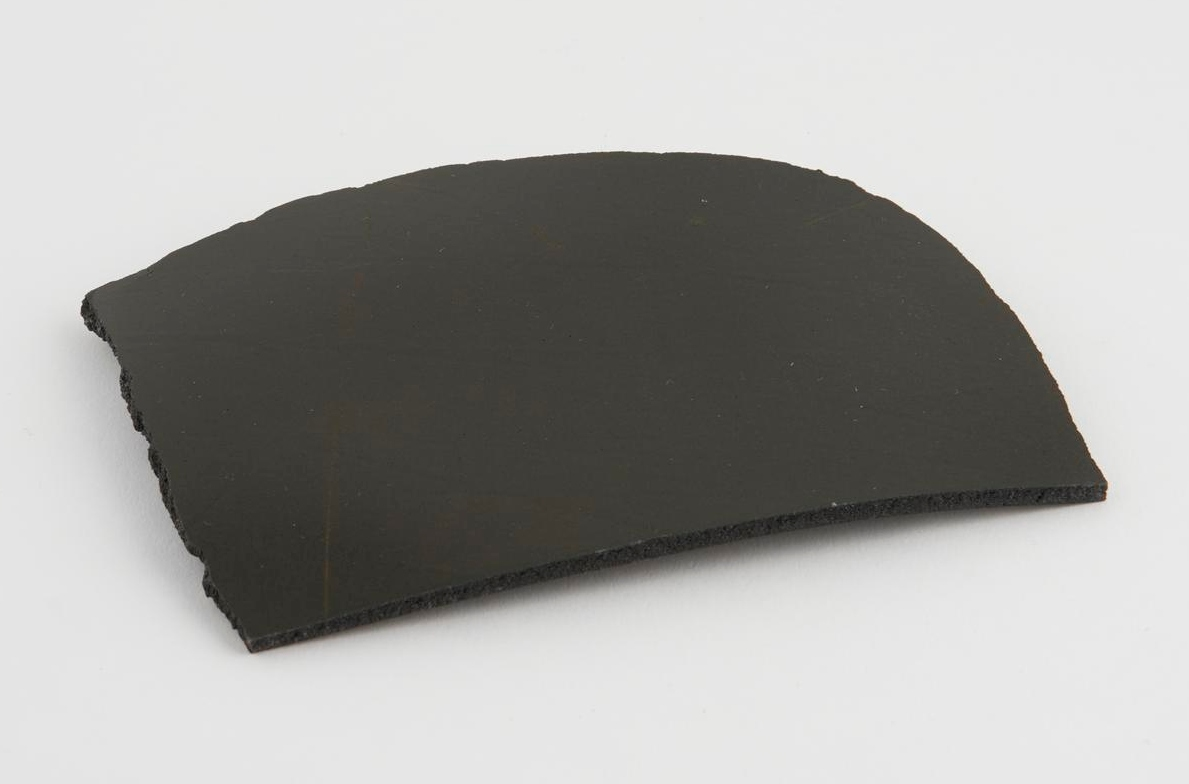
Plastic embedded with boron carbide used as shielding in neutron experiments at the Atomic Energy Research Establishment, UK

== Applications ==
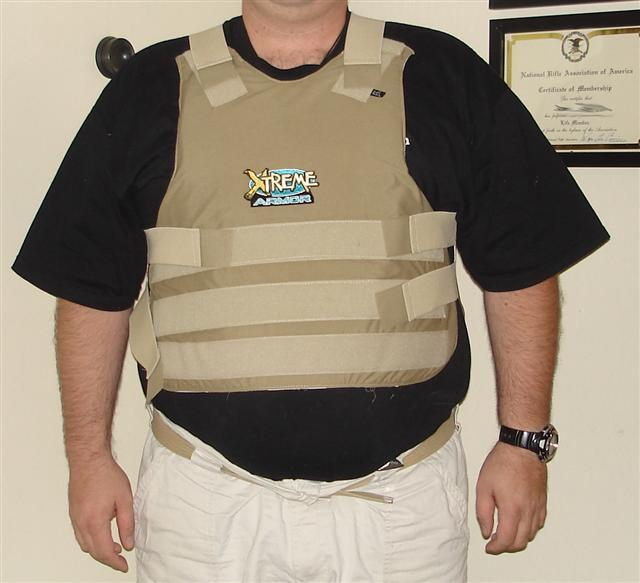
Boron carbide is used for inner plates of ballistic vests

Boron carbide's high hardness makes it useful in the following applications:

- Padlocks
- Personal and vehicle ballistic armor plating
- Grit blasting nozzles
- High-pressure water jet cutter nozzles
- Scratch and wear resistant coatings
- Cutting tools and dies
- Abrasives
- Metal matrix composites
- In brake linings of vehicles

Boron carbide's other properties also make it suitable for:

- Neutron absorber in nuclear reactors (see below)
- High energy fuel for solid fuel ramjets

=== Nuclear applications ===
The property of boron carbide to absorb neutrons without forming long-lived radionuclides makes it an attractive neutron radiation shielding or absorbing material, such as in use for control rods in nuclear power reactors. Nuclear applications of boron carbide include shielding and reaction regulation (control rod).

=== Boron carbide filaments ===
Boron carbide filaments exhibit auspicious prospects as reinforcement elements in resin and metal composites, attributed to their exceptional strength, elastic modulus, and low density characteristics.

== See also ==
- List of compounds with carbon number 1

== Bibliography ==
- Weimer, Alan W. (1997). Carbide, Nitride and Boride Materials Synthesis and Processing. Chapman & Hall (London, New York). ISBN 0-412-54060-6.
