= Lattice constant =

Physical dimensions of unit cells in a crystal

Unit cell definition using parallelepiped with lengths a, b, c and angles between the sides given by α, β, γ

A lattice constant or lattice parameter is one of the physical dimensions and angles that determine the geometry of the unit cells in a crystal lattice, and is proportional to the distance between atoms in the crystal. A simple cubic crystal has only one lattice constant, the distance between atoms, but, in general, lattices in three dimensions have six lattice constants: the lengths a, b, and c of the three cell edges meeting at a vertex, and the angles α, β, and γ between those edges.

The crystal lattice parameters a, b, and c have the dimension of length. The three numbers represent the size of the unit cell, that is, the distance from a given atom to an identical atom in the same position and orientation in a neighboring cell (except for very simple crystal structures, this will not necessarily be distance to the nearest neighbor). Their SI unit is the meter, and they are traditionally specified in angstroms (Å); an angstrom being 0.1 nanometer (nm), or 100 picometres (pm). Typical values start at a few angstroms. The angles α, β, and γ are usually specified in degrees.

== Introduction ==
A chemical substance in the solid state may form crystals in which the atoms, molecules, or ions are arranged in space according to one of a small finite number of possible crystal systems (lattice types), each with fairly well defined set of lattice parameters that are characteristic of the substance. These parameters typically depend on the temperature, pressure (or, more generally, the local state of mechanical stress within the crystal), electric and magnetic fields, and its isotopic composition. The lattice is usually distorted near impurities, crystal defects, and the crystal's surface. Parameter values quoted in manuals should specify those environment variables, and are usually averages affected by measurement errors.

Depending on the crystal system, some or all of the lengths may be equal, and some of the angles may have fixed values. In those systems, only some of the six parameters need to be specified. For example, in the cubic system, all of the lengths are equal and all the angles are 90°, so only the a length needs to be given. This is the case of diamond, which has a = 3.57 Å = 357 pm at 300 K. Similarly, in hexagonal system, the a and b constants are equal, and the angles are 60°, 90°, and 90°, so the geometry is determined by the a and c constants alone.

The lattice parameters of a crystalline substance can be determined using techniques such as X-ray diffraction or with an atomic force microscope. They can be used as a natural length standard of nanometer range. In the epitaxial growth of a crystal layer over a substrate of different composition, the lattice parameters must be matched in order to reduce strain and crystal defects.

== Volume ==
The volume of the unit cell can be calculated from the lattice constant lengths and angles. If the unit cell sides are represented as vectors, then the volume is the scalar triple product of the vectors. The volume is represented by the letter V. For the general unit cell

$$V = a b c \sqrt{1+2\cos\alpha\cos\beta\cos\gamma - \cos^2\alpha - \cos^2\beta - \cos^2\gamma}.$$

For monoclinic lattices with α = 90°, γ = 90°, this simplifies to

$$V = a b c \sin\beta.$$

For orthorhombic, tetragonal and cubic lattices with β = 90° as well, then

$$V = a b c .$$

== Lattice matching ==
Matching of lattice structures between two different semiconductor materials allows a region of band gap change to be formed in a material without introducing a change in crystal structure. This allows construction of advanced light-emitting diodes and diode lasers.

For example, gallium arsenide, aluminium gallium arsenide, and aluminium arsenide have almost equal lattice constants, marking it possible to grow almost arbitrarily thick layers of one on the other one.

== Lattice grading ==
Typically, films of different materials grown on the previous film or substrate are chosen to match the lattice constant of the prior layer to minimize film stress.

An alternative method is to grade the lattice constant from one value to another by a controlled altering of the alloy ratio during film growth. The beginning of the grading layer will have a ratio to match the underlying lattice and the alloy at the end of the layer growth will match the desired final lattice for the following layer to be deposited.

The rate of change in the alloy must be determined by weighing the penalty of layer strain, and hence defect density, against the cost of the time in the epitaxy tool.

For example, indium gallium phosphide layers with a band gap above 1.9 eV can be grown on gallium arsenide wafers with index grading.

== List of lattice constants ==
Lattice constants for various materials at 300 K
| Material | Lattice constant (Å) | Crystal structure | Ref. |
|---|---|---|---|
| C (diamond) | 3.567 | Diamond (FCC) | |
| C (graphite) | a = 2.461 c = 6.708 | Hexagonal | |
| Si | 5.431020511 | Diamond (FCC) | |
| Ge | 5.658 | Diamond (FCC) | |
| AlAs | 5.6605 | Zinc blende (FCC) | |
| AlP | 5.4510 | Zinc blende (FCC) | |
| AlSb | 6.1355 | Zinc blende (FCC) | |
| GaP | 5.4505 | Zinc blende (FCC) | |
| GaAs | 5.653 | Zinc blende (FCC) | |
| GaSb | 6.0959 | Zinc blende (FCC) | |
| InP | 5.869 | Zinc blende (FCC) | |
| InAs | 6.0583 | Zinc blende (FCC) | |
| InSb | 6.479 | Zinc blende (FCC) | |
| MgO | 4.212 | Halite (FCC) | |
| SiC | a = 3.086 c = 10.053 | Wurtzite | |
| CdS | 5.8320 | Zinc blende (FCC) | |
| CdSe | 6.050 | Zinc blende (FCC) | |
| CdTe | 6.482 | Zinc blende (FCC) | |
| ZnO | a = 3.25 c = 5.2 | Wurtzite (HCP) | |
| ZnO | 4.580 | Halite (FCC) | |
| ZnS | 5.420 | Zinc blende (FCC) | |
| PbS | 5.9362 | Halite (FCC) | |
| PbTe | 6.4620 | Halite (FCC) | |
| BN | 3.6150 | Zinc blende (FCC) | |
| BP | 4.5380 | Zinc blende (FCC) | |
| CdS | a = 4.160 c = 6.756 | Wurtzite | |
| ZnS | a = 3.82 c = 6.26 | Wurtzite | |
| AlN | a = 3.112 c = 4.982 | Wurtzite | |
| GaN | a = 3.189 c = 5.185 | Wurtzite | |
| InN | a = 3.533 c = 5.693 | Wurtzite | |
| LiF | 4.03 | Halite | |
| LiCl | 5.14 | Halite | |
| LiBr | 5.50 | Halite | |
| LiI | 6.01 | Halite | |
| NaF | 4.63 | Halite | |
| NaCl | 5.64 | Halite | |
| NaBr | 5.97 | Halite | |
| NaI | 6.47 | Halite | |
| KF | 5.34 | Halite | |
| KCl | 6.29 | Halite | |
| KBr | 6.60 | Halite | |
| KI | 7.07 | Halite | |
| RbF | 5.65 | Halite | |
| RbCl | 6.59 | Halite | |
| RbBr | 6.89 | Halite | |
| RbI | 7.35 | Halite | |
| CsF | 6.02 | Halite | |
| CsCl | 4.123 | Caesium chloride | |
| CsBr | 4.291 | Caesium chloride | |
| CsI | 4.567 | Caesium chloride | |
| Al | 4.046 | FCC | |
| Fe | 2.856 | BCC | |
| Ni | 3.499 | FCC | |
| Cu | 3.597 | FCC | |
| Mo | 3.142 | BCC | |
| Pd | 3.859 | FCC | |
| Ag | 4.079 | FCC | |
| W | 3.155 | BCC | |
| Pt | 3.912 | FCC | |
| Au | 4.065 | FCC | |
| Pb | 4.920 | FCC | |
| V | 3.0399 | BCC | |
| Nb | 3.3008 | BCC | |
| Ta | 3.3058 | BCC | |
| TiN | 4.249 | Halite | |
| ZrN | 4.577 | Halite | |
| HfN | 4.392 | Halite | |
| VN | 4.136 | Halite | |
| CrN | 4.149 | Halite | |
| NbN | 4.392 | Halite | |
| TiC | 4.328 | Halite | |
| ZrC_{0.97} | 4.698 | Halite | |
| HfC_{0.99} | 4.640 | Halite | |
| VC_{0.97} | 4.166 | Halite | |
| NbC_{0.99} | 4.470 | Halite | |
| TaC_{0.99} | 4.456 | Halite | |
| Cr_{3}C_{2} | a = 11.47 b = 5.545 c = 2.830 | Orthorhombic | |
| WC | a = 2.906 c = 2.837 | Hexagonal | |
| ScN | 4.52 | Halite | |
| LiNbO_{3} | a = 5.1483 c = 13.8631 | Hexagonal | |
| KTaO_{3} | 3.9885 | Cubic perovskite | |
| BaTiO_{3} | a = 3.994 c = 4.034 | Tetragonal perovskite | |
| SrTiO_{3} | 3.98805 | Cubic perovskite | |
| CaTiO_{3} | a = 5.381 b = 5.443 c = 7.645 | Orthorhombic perovskite | |
| PbTiO_{3} | a = 3.904 c = 4.152 | Tetragonal perovskite | |
| EuTiO_{3} | 7.810 | Cubic perovskite | |
| SrVO_{3} | 3.838 | Cubic perovskite | |
| CaVO_{3} | 3.767 | Cubic perovskite | |
| BaMnO_{3} | a = 5.673 c = 4.71 | Hexagonal | |
| CaMnO_{3} | a = 5.27 b = 5.275 c = 7.464 | Orthorhombic perovskite | |
| SrRuO_{3} | a = 5.53 b = 5.57 c = 7.85 | Orthorhombic perovskite | |
| YAlO_{3} | a = 5.179 b = 5.329 c = 7.37 | Orthorhombic perovskite | |
