= Zirconium carbide =

Chemical compound

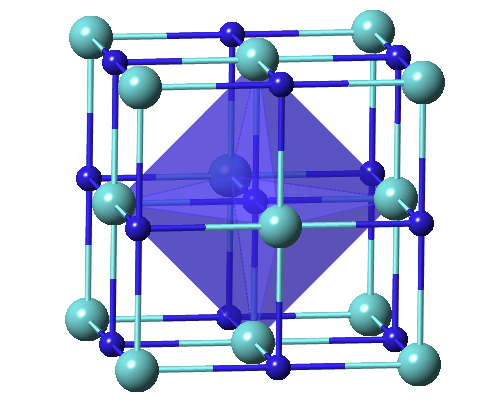
- Zirconium carbide in the unit cell

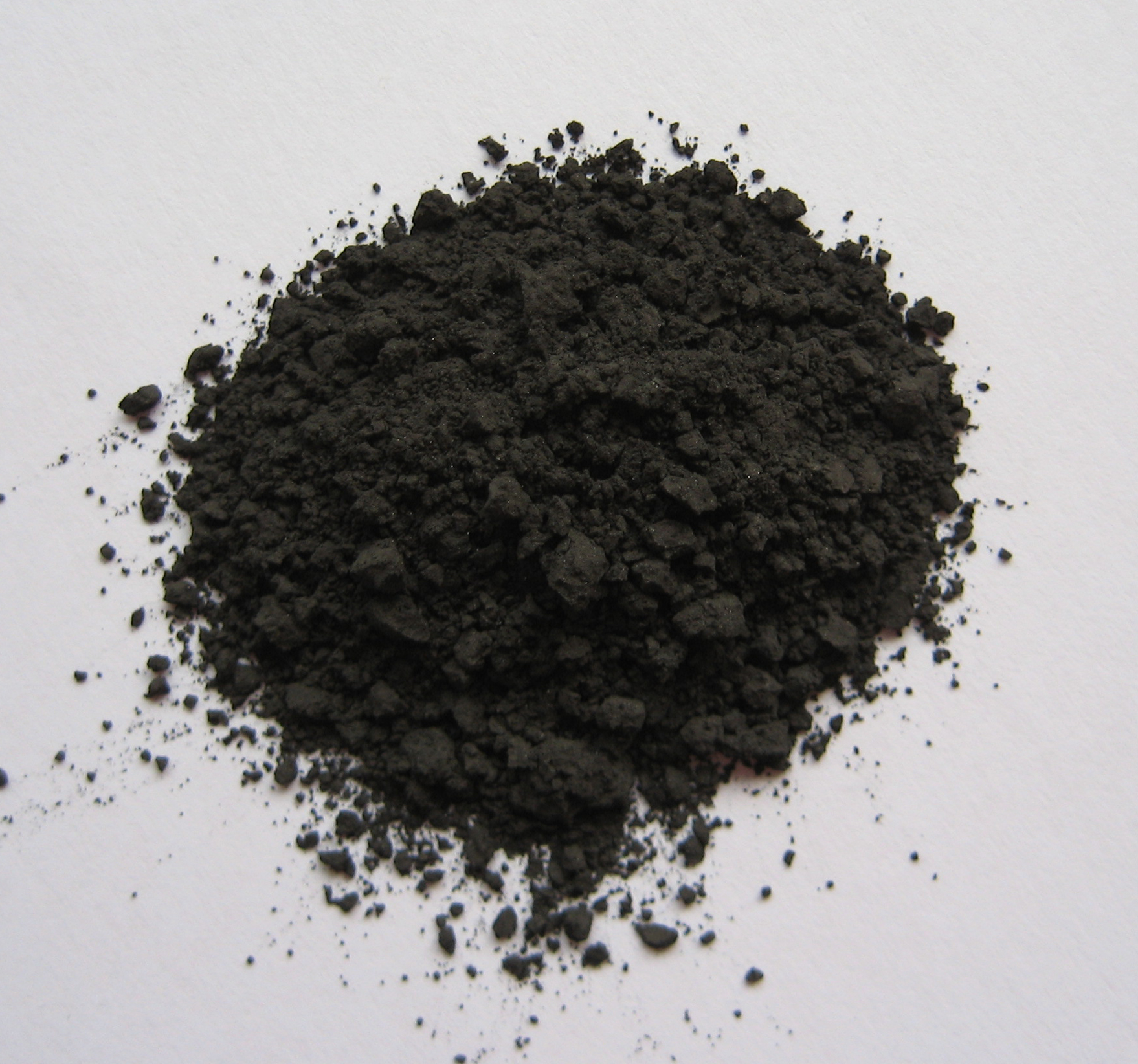
- Powder of zirconium carbide

Names
- Other names Zirconium(IV) carbide

Identifiers
CAS Number	12070-14-3
3D model (JSmol)	Interactive image
ChemSpider	9334398
ECHA InfoCard	100.031.920
EC Number	235-125-1
PubChem CID	11159298
RTECS number	ZH7155000
UN number	3178
CompTox Dashboard (EPA)	DTXSID60912099
- InChI: InChI=1S/C.Zr/q-1;+1 Key: MHMXYYDKIQTOHA-UHFFFAOYSA-N
- SMILES: [Zr+]#[C-]

Properties
Chemical formula	ZrC
Molar mass	103.235 g·mol^{−1}
Appearance	Gray refractory solid
Odor	Odorless
Density	6.73 g/cm^{3} (24 °C)
Melting point	3,532–3,540 °C (6,390–6,404 °F; 3,805–3,813 K)
Boiling point	5,100 °C (9,210 °F; 5,370 K)
Solubility in water	Insoluble
Solubility	Soluble in concentrated H_{2}SO_{4}, HF(aq), HNO_{3}

Structure
Crystal structure	Cubic, cF8
Space group	Fm3̅m, No. 225
Lattice constant	a = 4.6976(4) Å α = 90°, β = 90°, γ = 90°
Coordination geometry	Octahedral

Thermochemistry
Heat capacity (C)	37.442 J/(mol·K)
Std molar entropy (S^{⦵}_{298})	33.14 J/(mol·K)
Std enthalpy of formation (Δ_{f}H^{⦵}_{298})	−207 kJ/mol (extrapolated to stoichiometric composition) −196.65 kJ/mol

Hazards
- Occupational safety and health (OHS/OSH)
Main hazards	Pyrophoric
- GHS labelling
Pictograms	(GHS02: Flammable) (GHS07: Exclamation mark)
Signal word	Danger
Hazard statements	H228, H302, H312, H332
Precautionary statements	P210, P280
NFPA 704 (fire diamond)	0 0 0

Related compounds
Other anions	Zirconium nitride Zirconium oxide
Other cations	Titanium carbide Hafnium carbide Vanadium carbide Niobium carbide Tantalum carbide Chromium carbide Molybdenum carbide Tungsten carbide Silicon carbide
- Except where otherwise noted, data are given for materials in their standard state (at 25 °C [77 °F], 100 kPa). verify (what is ?) Infobox references

Zirconium carbide (ZrC) is an extremely hard refractory ceramic material, commercially used in tool bits for cutting tools. It is usually processed by sintering.

== Properties ==
Thermal expansion coefficients of ZrC
T	α_{V}
100 °C	0.141
200 °C	0.326
400 °C	0.711
800 °C	1.509
1200 °C	2.344

It appears as a gray metallic powder with cubic crystal structure. It is highly corrosion resistant. This group IV interstitial transition-metal carbide is also an example of ultra high temperature ceramics (UHTC). Due to the presence of metallic bonding, ZrC has a thermal conductivity of 20.5 W/(m·K) and an electrical conductivity of around 2.3 megasiemens per metre, both of which are similar to that for zirconium metal. The strong covalent Zr-C bond gives this material a very high melting point (~3530 °C), high elastic modulus (~440 GPa) and hardness (25 GPa). ZrC has a lower density (6.73 g/cm^{3}) compared to other carbides like WC (15.8 g/cm^{3}), TaC (14.5 g/cm^{3}) and HfC (12.67 g/cm^{3}). ZrC seems suitable for use in re-entry vehicles, rocket/scramjet engines or supersonic vehicles in which low densities and high temperature load-bearing capabilities are crucial requirements.

Like most carbides of refractory metals, zirconium carbide is sub-stoichiometric, i.e., it contains carbon vacancies. At carbon contents higher than approximately ZrC_{0.98} the material contains free carbon. ZrC is stable for a carbon-to-metal ratio ranging from 0.65 to 0.98.

The group IV and group IVa element carbides, TiC, ZrC, and SiC are practically inert toward attack by strong aqueous acids (e.g. HCl(aq)) and strong aqueous bases (NaOH) even at 100 °C, however, ZrC does react with HF.

The mixture of zirconium carbide and tantalum carbide is an important cermet material.

== Uses ==
Hafnium-free zirconium carbide and niobium carbide can be used as refractory coatings in nuclear reactors. Because of a low neutron absorption cross-section and weak damage sensitivity under irradiation, it finds use as the coating of uranium dioxide and thorium dioxide particles of nuclear fuel. The coating is usually deposited by thermal chemical vapor deposition in a fluidized bed reactor. It also has high emissivity and high current capacity at elevated temperatures, rendering it a promising material for use in thermo-photovoltaic radiators and field emitter tips and arrays.

It is also used as an abrasive, in cladding, cermets, incandescent filaments and cutting tools.

== Production ==
Zirconium carbide can be fabricated in several ways. One method is carbothermic reaction of zirconia by graphite. This results in a powder. Densified ZrC can then be made by sintering the powder of ZrC at upwards of 2000 °C. Hot pressing of ZrC can bring down the sintering temperature and consequently helps in producing fine grained fully densified ZrC. Spark plasma sintering also has been used to produce fully densified ZrC.

Zirconium carbide can also be fabricated by solution based processing. This is achieved by refluxing a metal oxide with acetylacetone.

Another method of fabrication is chemical vapour deposition. This is achieved by heating a zirconium sponge and passing halide gas through it.

Poor oxidation resistance over 800 °C limits the applications of ZrC. One way to improve the oxidation resistance of ZrC is to make composites. Important composites proposed are ZrC-ZrB_{2} and ZrC-ZrB_{2}-SiC. These composites can work up to 1800 °C. Another method to improve this is to use another material as a barrier layer, such as in TRISO fuel particles.
