= Molybdenum carbide =

Identifiers
CAS Number	MoC: 12011-97-1; Mo_{2}C: 12069-89-5
3D model (JSmol)	MoC: Interactive image; Mo_{2}C: Interactive image
ChemSpider	Mo_{2}C: 9162545
ECHA InfoCard	100.031.414
EC Number	MoC: 234-569-3; Mo_{2}C: 235-115-7
PubChem CID	MoC: 71623305; Mo_{2}C: 10987348
CompTox Dashboard (EPA)	DTXSID10923231
- InChI: MoC: InChI=1S/C.Mo; Mo_{2}C: InChI=1S/C.2Mo
- SMILES: MoC: [C]=[Mo]; Mo_{2}C: C(=[Mo])=[Mo]

Properties
Chemical formula	MoC and Mo_{2}C
Molar mass	107,961 g/mol (MoC) and 203,911 g/mol (Mo_{2}C)
Density	8.90 g/cm^{3}
Melting point	2,687 °C (4,869 °F; 2,960 K)

Related compounds
Related Refractory ceramic materials	Niobium carbide, tantalum carbide
- Except where otherwise noted, data are given for materials in their standard state (at 25 °C [77 °F], 100 kPa). Infobox references

Molybdenum carbide is an extremely hard, refractory, ceramic material, commercially used in tool bits for cutting tools.

There are at least three reported phases of molybdenum carbide: γ-MoC, β-Mo_{2}C, and γ'. The γ phase is structurally identical to tungsten carbide.

β-Mo_{2}C has been suggested as a catalyst for carbon dioxide hydrogenation. The γ' phase forms by combining the elements at relatively low temperatures, and transforms to the γ phase at 800 °C.
