= Metallocarbohedryne =

A metallocarbohedryne (met-car) is any one of a family of chemical compounds with the generic molecular formula M_{8}C_{12}, where M is a transition metal such as titanium, vanadium, zirconium, niobium, hafnium, molybdenum, chromium, or iron.

These compounds have similar properties and a similar molecular structure, with the eight metal atoms at the corners of a somewhat distorted cube, and the twelve carbon atoms, in pairs, placed diagonally across the faces of the cube. The structure can also be described as two intersecting tetrahedra of metal atoms, with the carbon atoms placed in pairs along the edges of one tetrahedron. They have been extensively studied in the gas phase, and sometimes dispersed in solid materials, but so far have not been produced in bulk or in solution. Nevertheless, they have attracted interest because of their stability and symmetry, a relatively low ionization potential, delayed extraction, and possibly interesting magnetic properties. Some authors suggest that they may eventually find applications in electronics and catalysis.

The name is also used for the corresponding cations M_{8}C^{n+}_{12} and anions M_{8}C^{n-}_{12}.

The first papers used the name metallo-carbohedrene (with or without the hyphen) for this type of compound.

== History ==
The earliest known member of this family is the cation Ti_{8}C^{+}_{12}, discovered by Guo, kerns, and Castleman in 1992 while researching the dehydrogenation of various hydrocarbons (including methane, acetylene, ethylene, benzene, and propylene) with titanium atoms, in the gas phase. Although fullerenes like C_{60} were already known, that may have been the first cage-like molecule with metal atoms replacing carbon at some corners of the mesh. They observed that the cluster would bind eight ammonia molecules, indicating that the eight titanium atoms were exposed. They also observed the analogous cations with vanadium, zirconium, or hafnium substituted for titanium, the corresponding neutral molecules, and the anion V_{8}C^{−}_{12}.

== Synthesis ==
Metallocarbohedrynes can be readily generated by vaporizing the desired metal with a laser, in an atmosphere containing the suitable hydrocarbon. The technique can produce mixed clusters, such as Ti_{8-x}Zr_{x}C_{12}.

They have been also detected, at a concentration of 1% or less, in the soot generated by an electric arc between two Ti-C electrodes.

== Structure ==
The structure of these clusters has been extensively investigated since their discovery. At first, the 20 atoms of Ti_{8}C^{+}_{12} were conjectured to be arranged as the vertices of a dodecahedron, with the titanium atoms at the corners of a cube, and two carbon atom pairs, on opposite faces, aligned with each set of four parallel edges of the cube. This structure was conjectured to be analogous to that of the hypothetical dodecahedral fullerene C_{20}. However, this claim was soon disputed by Linus Pauling who proposed an alternative arrangement—with the titanium atoms still at the corners of a cube, but with the carbon atoms pushed inwards so as to be nearly coplanar with the faces of that cube.

=== Theoretical studies ===
The first ab initio theoretical investigations of the structure of Ti_{8}C_{12} (by Li and others, Methfessel and others, in 1993) indicated a slightly distorted version of the dodecahedron proposed by Guo and others, with C-C distances 139 pm and Ti-C distances 199 pm. In this model, the eight titanium atoms were still equivalent and located at the corners of a cube, with C-C pairs parallel to edges, so that the molecule would have the symmetry group $T_h$. Nevertheless, they found the atoms are almost equidistant from the center, (260 pm for C, 262 pm for Ti). The electronic structure however was quite unlike that of graphite and C_{60}.

Several other models were proposed. Ceulemans and Fowler proposed a ring of 12 carbon atoms capped by two Ti_{4} tetrahedra. Khan proposed a cage of 12 carbons at the vertices of a cuboctahedron, surrounded by an elongated cage of metal atoms.

Eventually a consensus was reached on a structure proposed by Dance and others, in which the metal atoms are divided in two groups of four ("outer" or "o-", and "inner" or "i-"), at the vertices of two intersecting concentric regular tetrahedra, with different radii and opposite orientations; and the six carbon pairs are aligned with the edges of the larger tetrahedron. This structure can be seen as a deformation of the original proposal, by pulling four vertices of the cube slightly outwards, and rotating the carbon pairs by 45 degrees. Its symmetry group is $T_d$ instead of $T_h$, and it was predicted to have considerably lower energy (by 300 kcal/mol). Indeed, the formation of Ti_{8}C_{12} with the Dance structure was predicted to be energetically favored (exothermic) relative to metallic titanium and graphite.

Acceptance of this structure was delayed because the yields of the various clusters Ti_{8-x}Zr_{x}C_{12} in Guo's process suggested that the eight metal atom sites were equivalent. In particular, the cluster Ti_{4}Zr_{4}C_{12} did not seem to be exceptionally stable. However, the energy difference between placing the four zirconium atoms in the inner positions, rather than the outer ones, was eventually computed to be only 0.5 kcal/mol.

In 2003, Hou and others predicted a slight displacement of two of the carbon pairs, that reduced the symmetry group to $D_{2d}$ A similar conclusion had been reached by Chen and others. However, later studies by Lou and Nordlander concluded that the $T_d$ form had lower energy (by about 70 kcal/mol) However, the zinc cluster Zn_{8}C_{12} was predicted to have the symmetrical dodecahedral ($T_h$) structure suggested by Guo for the titanium cluster.

Electronically, Ti_{8}C_{12} is believed to have a metallic character, with 80 delocalized valence electrons. Its static polarizability was computed to be of the same order of magnitude as that of the fullerene C_{60}.

== Spectroscopy and ionization ==
Pilgrim and Duncan observed in 1993 that Ti_{8}C^{+}_{12} can be dissociated by visible light. Ti_{7}C^{+}_{12} is a fragment of Ti_{8}C^{+}_{12}

In 1998, Sakurai and Castleman measured ionization potentials of Ti_{8-x}Zr_{x}C_{12} via near threshold photoionization spectroscopy. In particular, they got 4.40 eV of for Ti_{8}C_{12} and 3.95 eV for Zr_{8}C_{12}. The former value was said to be more consistent with the $T_d$ structure than the $T_h$ one.

The infrared spectrum of neutral Ti_{8}C_{12} and of Ti_{8}C^{+}_{12} cations was studied by van Heijnsbergen and others, starting 1999. They measured clusters in the gas phase, accumulated as cations in an ion trap. They saw evidence that the loss of one electron from Ti_{8}C_{12} to Ti_{8}C^{+}_{12} does not change the structure significantly.

In 2004, Martínez and others computed from theoretical models the optical absorption spectrum of Ti_{8}C_{12} and V_{8}C_{12}. They predicted a broad spectrum for both, with high absorption starting at about 8 eV and centered around 12–14 eV.

== Reactions ==
The chemistry of Ti_{8}C_{12} and it analogs was studied in the gas phase, already by Castleman's and others. After creation, the ionized clusters were separated from other species by mass spectrometry, and injected into a drift tube containing the gaseous reactant, diluted in helium.

With theoretical computations, Huo and others predicted that the clusters Ti_{8}C_{12} and Mo_{8}C_{12} could bind 4 carbonyls, at outer metal atoms.

== Potential applications ==
While the clusters have yet to be produced in bulk, they have been investigated theoretically for possible use as catalysts.

== Desulfurization of oil ==
Specifically, in 2004 Liu and others have simulated the decomposition of thiophene C_{4}H_{4}S by three hydrogen molecules to 2-butene C_{4}H_{8} and hydrogen disulfide H_{2}S, catalyzed by a neutral Ti_{8}C_{12}. This reaction is an important step in the removal of sulfur from oil. They predicted that the first H_{2} molecule would spontaneously dissociate in contact with the C_{2} pairs, and each H atom would then migrate to the adjacent outer titanium atom ("o-Ti"). The thiophene would then react exothermally with each H atom in turn, yielding a butadiene attached to an o-Ti and the sulfur atom attached at the nearby inner titanium ("i-Ti") atom. A second H_{2} molecule would then dissociate at the o-Ti site and turn butadiene into 2-butene. A third H_{2} would dissociate at an o-Ti site, and the two atoms would migrate to the i-Ti atom bearing the sulfur atom, and convert it into H_{2}S.

== See also ==
- Titanium carbide
- Iron carbide
- Vanadium carbide
- Chevrel phase – similar cubical crystal unit
