= Zirconium nitride =

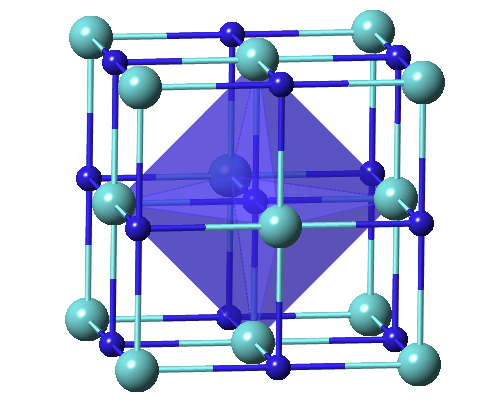
- Zirconium nitride in the unit cell

Names
- IUPAC name Zirconium nitride
- Other names Zirconium(III) nitride, Nitridozirconium

Identifiers
CAS Number	25658-42-8
3D model (JSmol)	(Zr≡N): Interactive image
ChEBI	CHEBI:197403
ChemSpider	85159
ECHA InfoCard	100.042.864
EC Number	247-166-2
PubChem CID	94359
CompTox Dashboard (EPA)	DTXSID2067119
- InChI: InChI=1S/N.Zr Key: ZVWKZXLXHLZXLS-UHFFFAOYSA-N
- SMILES: (Zr≡N): N#[Zr]

Properties
Chemical formula	ZrN
Appearance	Yellow-brown crystals
Odor	Odorless
Density	7.09 g/cm^{3} (24 °C)
Melting point	2,952 °C (5,346 °F; 3,225 K) at 760 mmHg
Solubility in water	Insoluble
Solubility	Soluble in concentrated HF, acids

Structure
Crystal structure	Cubic, cF8
Space group	Fm3̅m, No. 225
Lattice constant	a = 4.5675 Å α = 90°, β = 90°, γ = 90°
Coordination geometry	Octahedral

Thermochemistry
Heat capacity (C)	40.442 J/(mol·K)
Std molar entropy (S^{⦵}_{298})	38.83 J/(mol·K)
Std enthalpy of formation (Δ_{f}H^{⦵}_{298})	−365.26 kJ/mol

Related compounds
Related refractory ceramic materials	Tantalum carbide Niobium carbide Zirconium carbide
- Except where otherwise noted, data are given for materials in their standard state (at 25 °C [77 °F], 100 kPa). verify (what is ?) Infobox references

Zirconium nitride (ZrN) is an inorganic compound used in a variety of ways due to its properties.

== Properties ==
ZrN grown by physical vapor deposition (PVD) is a light gold color similar to elemental gold. ZrN has a room-temperature electrical resistivity of 12.0 μΩ·cm, a temperature coefficient of resistivity of 5.6·10^{−8} Ω·cm/K, a superconducting transition temperature of 10.4 K, and a relaxed lattice parameter of 0.4575 nm. The hardness of single-crystal ZrN is 22.7±1.7 GPa and elastic modulus is 450 GPa.

== Uses ==
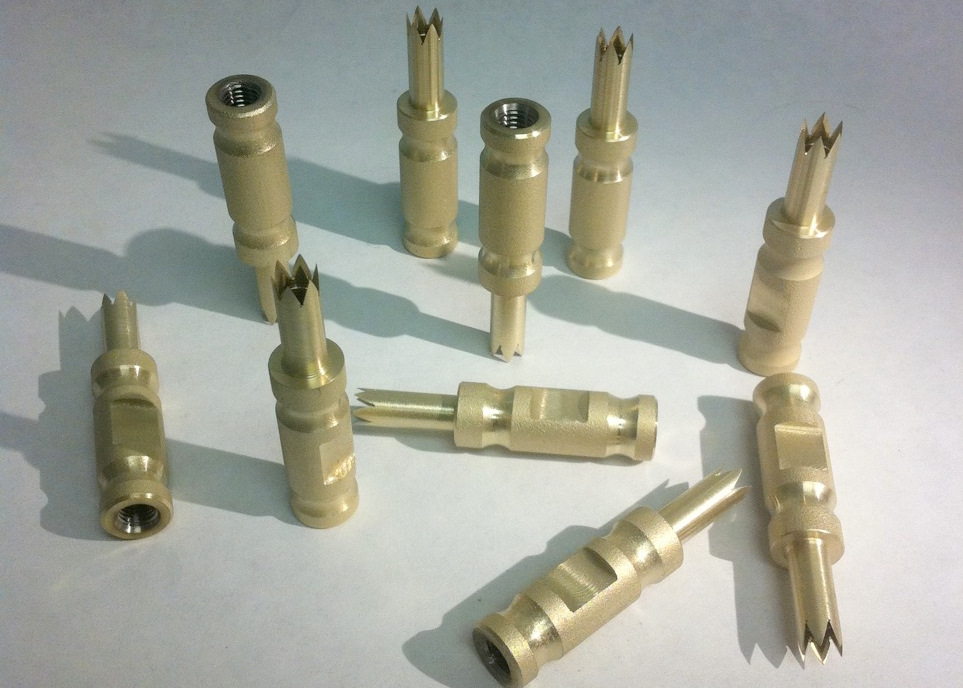
Zirconium nitride coated cutters.

Zirconium nitride is a hard ceramic material similar to titanium nitride and is a cement-like refractory material. Thus it is used in cermets and laboratory crucibles. When applied using the physical vapor deposition coating process it is commonly used for coating medical devices, industrial parts (notably drill bits), automotive and aerospace components and other parts subject to high wear and corrosive environments.

Zirconium nitride was suggested as a hydrogen peroxide fuel tank liner for rockets and aircraft.
