= Salamander Brick Works =

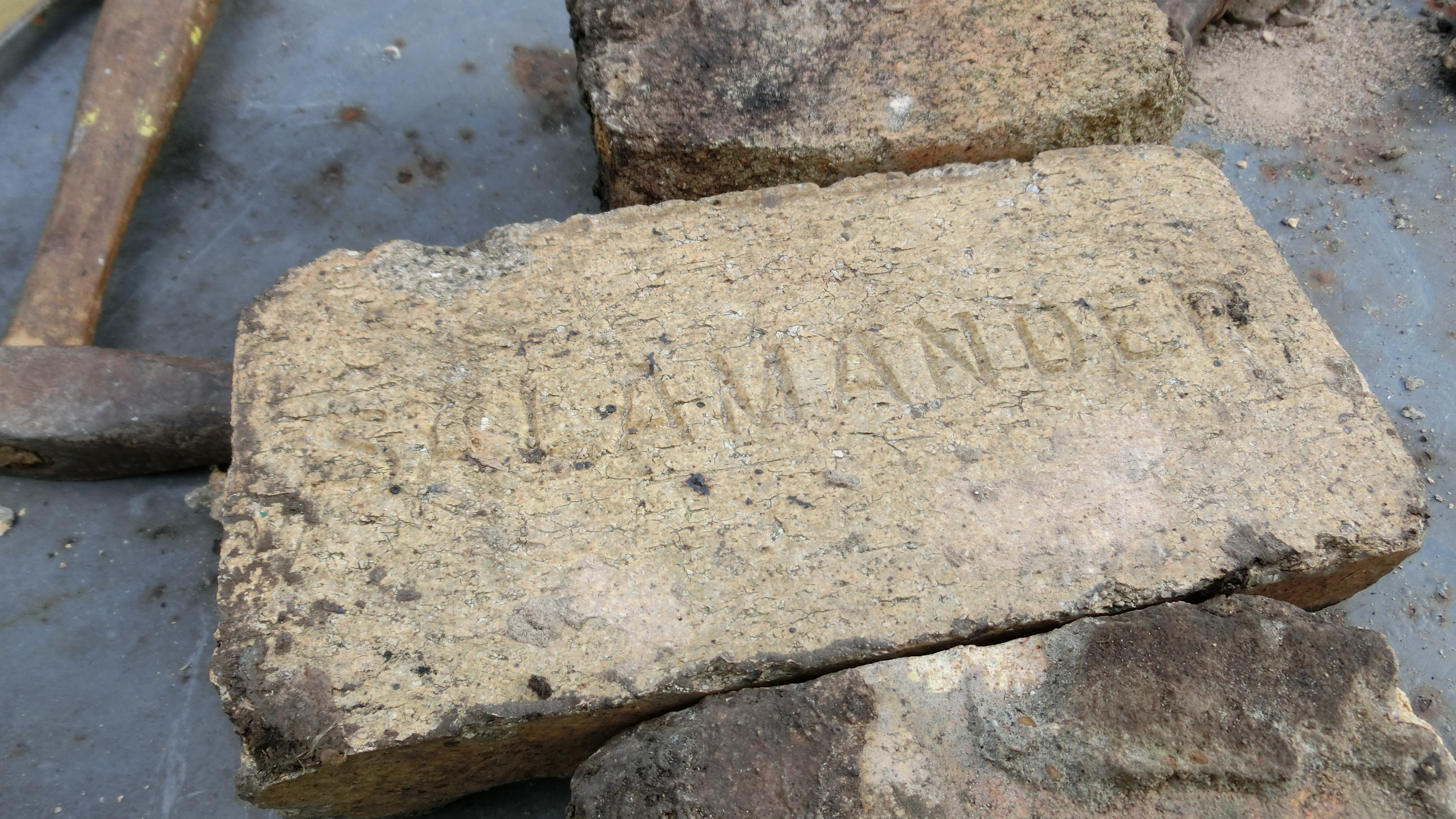
Refractory brick with "Salamander" written on its face.

The Salamander Brick Works was a company located in Woodbridge, New Jersey that produced refractory bricks, pipes, and pottery products from 1825 to the early 1900s. The company had changed ownership multiple times until William Poillon purchased the Salamander Brick Works in 1867. in 1896 the factory was destroyed by a fire. The owner's wives Mary Poillon and Clara Poillon had recently started production of pottery products in Jersey City, they invested in a new kiln for the Salamander plant and moved their pottery production there. The company was owned by the Poillon family for several decades, until its end some time after 1904.

The company was located along Rahway Avenue in Woodbridge New Jersey. Part of that land has since been added to Parker Press Park, with other sections used for Shops and Restaurants. The road that now cuts through the land is named Poillon Street after the owners of the factory that once stood there.
