= Tantalum hafnium carbide =

Identifiers
CAS Number	71243-79-3
3D model (JSmol)	Interactive image
ECHA InfoCard	100.068.426
EC Number	275-291-2
CompTox Dashboard (EPA)	DTXSID60103900
- InChI: InChI=1S/5C.Hf.4Ta Key: SWQWZVPEXQVZCJ-UHFFFAOYSA-N
- SMILES: [C].[C].[C].[C].[C].[Hf].[Ta].[Ta].[Ta].[Ta]

Properties
Chemical formula	Ta_{4}HfC_{5}
Molar mass	962.34 g·mol^{−1}
Melting point	3,905 °C; 7,061 °F; 4,178 K
- Except where otherwise noted, data are given for materials in their standard state (at 25 °C [77 °F], 100 kPa). verify (what is ?) Infobox references

Tantalum hafnium carbide is a refractory chemical compound with a general formula Ta_{x}Hf_{y}C_{x+y}, which can be considered as a solid solution of tantalum carbide and hafnium carbide. It was originally thought to have the highest melting point of any known substance, but new research has proven that hafnium carbonitride has a higher melting point.

== Properties ==
Individually, the tantalum and hafnium carbides have the highest melting points among the binary compounds, 4,041 K (3,768 °C; 6,814 °F) and 4,232 K (3,959 °C; 7,158 °F), respectively, and their "alloy" with a composition Ta_{4}HfC_{5} has a melting point of 4,178 K (3,905 °C; 7,061 °F).

Very few measurements of melting point in tantalum hafnium carbide have been reported, because of the experimental difficulties at extreme temperatures. A 1965 study of the TaC-HfC solid solutions at temperatures 2,225–2,275 °C found a minimum in the vaporization rate and thus maximum in the thermal stability for Ta_{4}HfC_{5}. This rate was comparable to that of tungsten and was weakly dependent on the initial density of the samples, which were sintered from TaC-HfC powder mixtures, also at 2,225–2,275 °C. In a separate study, Ta_{4}HfC_{5} was found to have the minimum oxidation rate among the TaC-HfC solid solutions. Ta_{4}HfC_{5} was manufactured by Goodfellow company as a 45 μm powder at a price of $9,540/kg (99.0% purity).

In 2015, atomistic simulations predicted that hafnium carbonitride could have a melting point exceeding Ta_{4}HfC_{5} by 200 K. This was later verified by experimental evidence in 2020.

== Structure ==
Individual tantalum and hafnium carbides have a rocksalt cubic lattice structure. They are usually carbon deficient and have nominal formulas TaC_{x} and HfC_{x}, with x = 0.7–1.0 for Ta and x = 0.56–1.0 for Hf. The same structure is also observed for at least some of their solid solutions. The density calculated from X-ray diffraction data is 13.6 g/cm^{3} for Ta_{0.5}Hf_{0.5}C. Hexagonal NiAs-type structure (space group P63/mmc, No. 194, Pearson symbol hP4) with a density of 14.76 g/cm^{3} was reported for Ta_{0.9}Hf_{0.1}C_{0.5}.

== See also ==
- Tantalum carbide
- Hafnium carbide
- Hafnium carbonitride
