= Tantalum carbide =

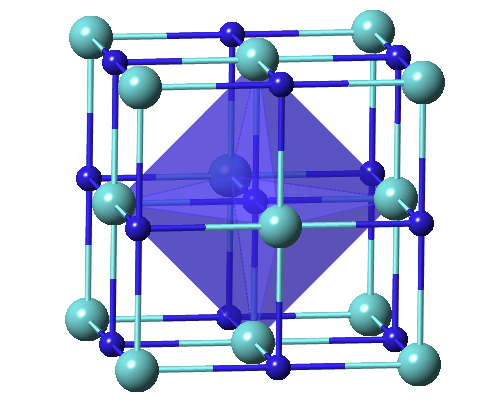
- γ-tantalum carbide in cubic phase

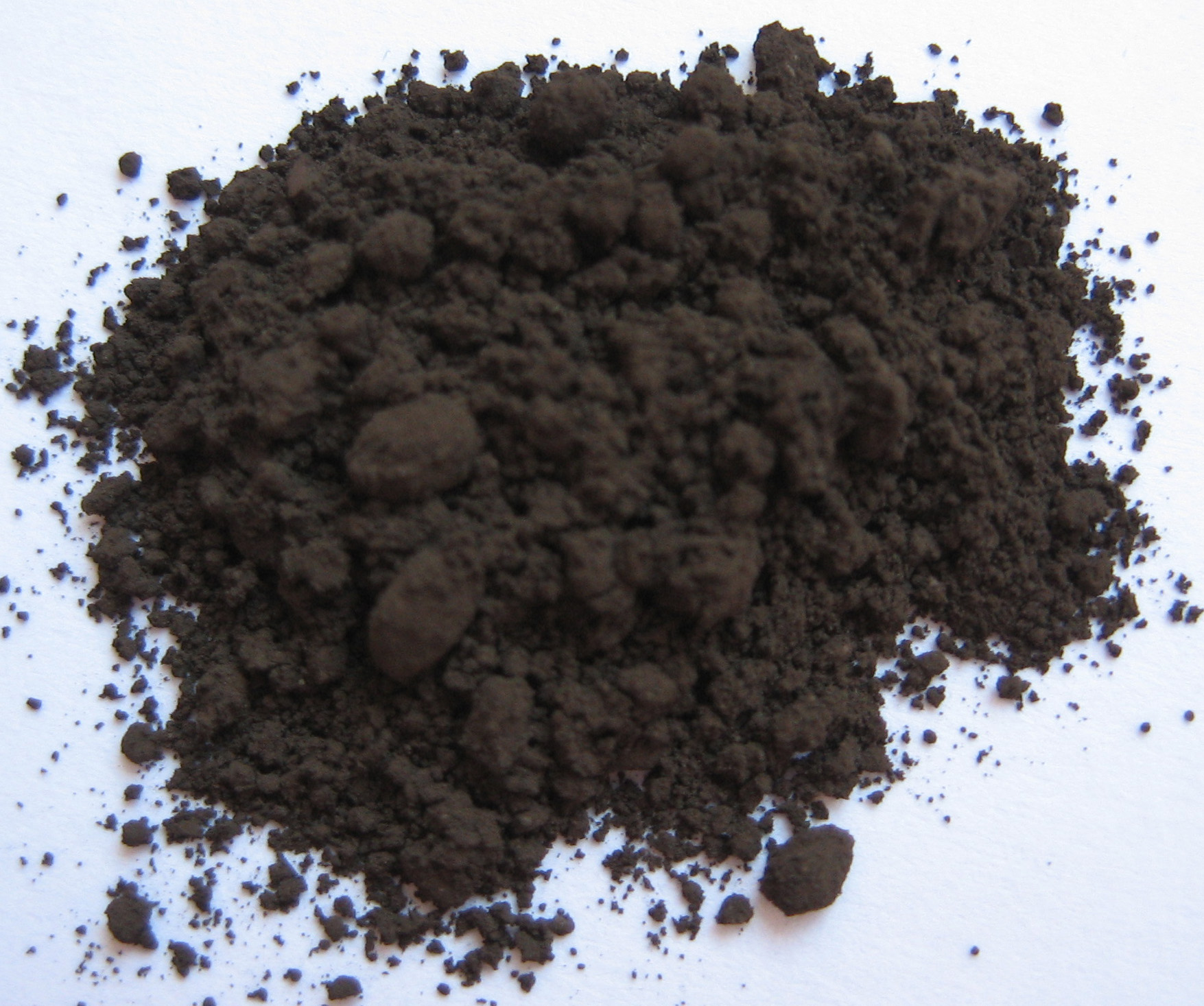
- Powder of tantalum carbide

Names
- IUPAC name Tantalum carbide
- Other names Tantalum(IV) carbide

Identifiers
CAS Number	(TaC): 12070-06-3; (TaC_{0.5}): 12070-07-4
3D model (JSmol)	(TaC): Interactive image; (TaC_{0.5}): Interactive image
ChemSpider	(TaC): 22369341
ECHA InfoCard	100.031.914
EC Number	(TaC): 235-118-3; (TaC_{0.5}): 235-119-9
PubChem CID	(TaC): 159432; (TaC_{0.5}): 166602
UNII	(TaC): 4ZUXHGUFHH
CompTox Dashboard (EPA)	(TaC): DTXSID40893837
- InChI: (TaC): InChI=1S/C.Ta/q-1;+1 Key: DUMHRFXBHXIRTD-UHFFFAOYSA-N; (TaC_{0.5}): InChI=1S/C.2Ta Key: VDBAWDHDCVOEAA-UHFFFAOYSA-N
- SMILES: (TaC): [Ta+]#[C-]; (TaC_{0.5}): [C].[Ta].[Ta]

Properties
Chemical formula	TaC
Molar mass	192.96 g/mol
Appearance	Brown-gray powder
Odor	Odorless
Density	14.3–14.65 g/cm^{3} (TaC); 15.1 g/cm^{3} (TaC_{0.5})
Melting point	3,768 °C (6,814 °F; 4,041 K) (TaC); 3,327 °C (6,021 °F; 3,600 K) (TaC_{0.5})
Boiling point	4,780–5,470 °C (8,640–9,880 °F; 5,050–5,740 K) (TaC)
Solubility in water	Insoluble
Solubility	Soluble in HF-HNO_{3} mixture
Thermal conductivity	21 W/(m·K)

Thermochemistry
Heat capacity (C)	36.71 J/(mol·K)
Std molar entropy (S^{⦵}_{298})	42.29 J/(mol·K)
Std enthalpy of formation (Δ_{f}H^{⦵}_{298})	−144.1 kJ/mol

Related compounds
Related refractory ceramic materials	Zirconium nitride; Vanadium carbide; Niobium carbide; Zirconium carbide
Related compounds	Hafnium carbide
- Except where otherwise noted, data are given for materials in their standard state (at 25 °C [77 °F], 100 kPa). verify (what is ?) Infobox references

Tantalum carbides (TaC) form a family of binary chemical compounds of tantalum and carbon with the empirical formula TaC_{x}, where x usually varies between 0.4 and 1. They are extremely hard, brittle, refractory ceramic materials with metallic electrical conductivity. They appear as brown-gray powders, which are usually processed by sintering.

Being important cermet materials, tantalum carbides are commercially used in tool bits for cutting applications and are sometimes added to tungsten carbide alloys.

The melting points of tantalum carbides was previously estimated to be about 3,880 °C (4,150 K; 7,020 °F) depending on the purity and measurement conditions; this value is among the highest for binary compounds. And only tantalum hafnium carbide was estimated to have a higher melting point of 3,942 °C (4,215 K; 7,128 °F). However new tests have conclusively proven that TaC actually has a melting point of 3,768 °C and both tantalum hafnium carbide and hafnium carbide have higher melting points.

== Preparation ==
TaC_{x} powders of desired composition are prepared by heating a mixture of tantalum and graphite powders in vacuum or inert-gas atmosphere (argon). The heating is performed at a temperature of about 2,000 °C (2,270 K; 3,630 °F) using a furnace or an arc-melting setup. An alternative technique is reduction of tantalum pentoxide by carbon in vacuum or hydrogen atmosphere at a temperature of 1,500–1,700 °C (1,770–1,970 K; 2,730–3,090 °F). This method was used to obtain tantalum carbide in 1876, but it lacks control over the stoichiometry of the product. Production of TaC directly from the elements has been reported through self-propagating high-temperature synthesis.

== Crystal structure ==
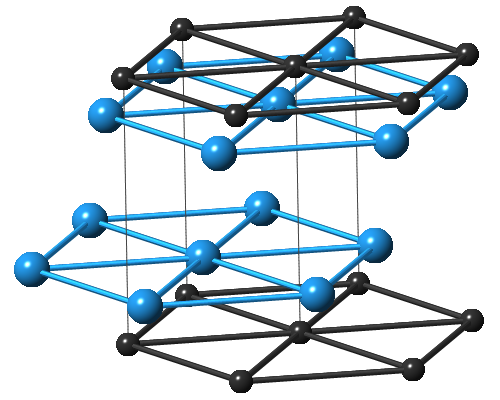
β-TaC_{0.5} with the unit cell, blue color is tantalum

TaC_{x} compounds have a cubic (rock-salt) crystal structure for x = 0.7–1.0; the lattice parameter increases with x. TaC_{0.5} has two major crystalline forms. The more stable one has an anti-cadmium iodide-type trigonal structure, which transforms upon heating to about 2,000 °C into a hexagonal lattice with no long-range order for the carbon atoms.

Formula	Symmetry	Type	Pearson symbol	Space group	No	Z	ρ (g/cm^{3})	a (nm)	c (nm)
TaC	Cubic	NaCl	cF8	Fm3̅m	225	4	14.6	0.4427	
TaC_{0.75}	Trigonal		hR24	R3̅m	166	12	15.01	0.3116	3
TaC_{0.5}	Trigonal	anti-CdI2	hP3	P3̅m1	164	1	15.08	0.3103	0.4938
TaC_{0.5}	Hexagonal		hP4	P6_{3}/mmc	194	2	15.03	0.3105	0.4935

Here Z is the number of formula units per unit cell, ρ is the density calculated from lattice parameters.

== Properties ==
The bonding between tantalum and carbon atoms in tantalum carbides is a complex mixture of ionic, metallic and covalent contributions, and because of the strong covalent component, these carbides are very hard and brittle materials. For example, TaC has a microhardness of 1,600–2,000 kg/mm^{2} (~9 Mohs) and an elastic modulus of 285 GPa, whereas the corresponding values for tantalum are 110 kg/mm^{2} and 186 GPa.

Tantalum carbides have metallic electrical conductivity, both in terms of its magnitude and temperature dependence. TaC is a superconductor with a relatively high transition temperature of T_{C} = 10.35 K.

The magnetic properties of TaC_{x} change from diamagnetic for x ≤ 0.9 to paramagnetic at larger x. An inverse behavior (para-diamagnetic transition with increasing x) is observed for HfC_{x}, despite that it has the same crystal structure as TaC_{x}.

== Application ==
Tantalum carbide is widely used as sintering additive in ultra-high temperature ceramics (UHTCs) or as a ceramic reinforcement in high-entropy alloys (HEAs) due to its excellent physical properties in melting point, hardness, elastic modulus, thermal conductivity, thermal shock resistance, and chemical stability, which makes it a desirable material for aircraft and rockets in aerospace industries.

Wang et al. have synthesized SiBCN ceramic matrix with TaC addition by mechanical alloying plus reactive hot-pressing sintering methods, in which BN, graphite and TaC powders were mixed with ball-milling and sintered at 1,900 °C (2,170 K; 3,450 °F) to obtain SiBCN-TaC composites. For the synthesis, the ball-milling process refined the TaC powders down to 5 nm without reacting with other components, allowing to form agglomerates that are composed of spherical clusters with a diameter of 100 nm-200 nm. TEM analysis showed that TaC is distributed either randomly in the form of nanoparticles with sizes of 10-20 nm within the matrix or distributed in BN with smaller size of 3-5 nm. As a result, the composite with 10 wt% addition of TaC improved the fracture toughness of the matrix, reaching 399.5 MPa compared to 127.9 MPa of pristine SiBCN ceramics. This is mainly due to the mismatch of thermal expansion coefficients between TaC and SiBCN ceramic matrix. Since TaC has a larger coefficient of thermal expansion than that of SiBCN matrix, TaC particles endures tensile stress while the matrix endures tensile stress in radial direction and compressive stress in tangential direction. This makes the cracks to bypass the particles and absorbs some energy to achieve toughening. In addition, the uniform distribution of TaC particles contributes to the yield stress explained by Hall-Petch relationship due to a decrease in grain size.

Wei et al. have synthesized novel refractory MoNbRe0.5W(TaC)x HEA matrix using vacuum arc melting. XRD patterns showed that the resulting material is mainly composed of a single BCC crystal structure in the base alloy MoNbRe0.5W and a multi-component (MC) type carbide of (Nb, Ta, Mo, W)C to form a lamellar eutectic structure, with the amount of MC phase proportional to TaC addition. TEM analysis showed that the lamellar interface between BCC and MC phase presents a smooth and curvy morphology which exhibits good bonding with no lattice misfit dislocations. As a result, the grain size decreases with increasing TaC addition which improves the yield stress explained by Hall-Petch relationship. The formation of lamellar structure is because at elevated temperature, the decomposition reaction occurs in the MoNbRe0.5W(TaC)x composites:

(Mo,Nb,W,Ta)_{2}C → (Mo,Nb,W,Ta) + (Mo,Nb,W,Ta)C

in which Re is dissolved in both components to nucleate BCC phase first and MC phase in the following, according to the phase diagrams. In addition, the MC phase also improves the strength of composites, due to its stiffer and more elastic property compared to BCC phase.

Wu et al. have also synthesized Ti(C, N)-based cermets with TaC addition with ball-milling and sintering at 1,683 K (1,410 °C; 2,570 °F). TEM analysis showed that TaC helps dissolution of carbonitride phase and converts to TaC-binder phase. The resulting is a formation of “black-core-white rim” structure with decreasing grain size in the region of 3-5 wt% TaC addition and increasing transverse rupture strength (TRS). 0-3 wt% TaC region showed a decrease in the TRS because the TaC addition decreases the wettability between binder and carbonitride phase and creates pores. Further addition of TaC beyond 5 wt% also decreases TRS because TaC agglomerates during sintering and porosity again forms. The best TRS is found at 5wt% addition where fine grains and homogeneous microstructure are achieved for less grain boundary sliding.

== Natural occurrence ==
Tantalcarbide is a natural form of tantalum carbide. It is a cubic, extremely rare mineral.

== See also ==
- Tantalum hafnium carbide
- Hafnium carbide
- Hafnium carbonitride
