= Titanium-rich scaffold formation =

Titanium-rich scaffold formation is a technical measure used in the blast furnace in order to protect the refractory furnace lining material from erosion by depositing a protection layer over it. It is particularly used to protect the refractory of the blast furnace hearth, located at the bottom of the blast furnace where droplets of melted iron accumulates. The operation is conducted by inserting Ti ore either by injecting it through one or more tuyeres (one of 20 or more pipe openings introducing hot gas into the furnace) as a powder, or by adding it to the ore together with coke and iron ore from the furnace top.

== Mechanism ==
The titania (TiOx) reaches the slag phase where it reduces to titanium. This titanium will enter the liquid iron phase which will then be carried along the flow of the liquid iron toward the eroded portions of the hearth refractory. Due to the change of the carbon concentration and the temperature at eroded regions of the hearth, the solubility of Ti in liquid iron will reduce, causing Ti to react with carbon and nitrogen in the liquid. Titanium carbide and titanium nitride solid particles form, which are thought to deposit on the eroded portions of the hearth refractory, forming a protection layer.
