= Hafnium carbide =

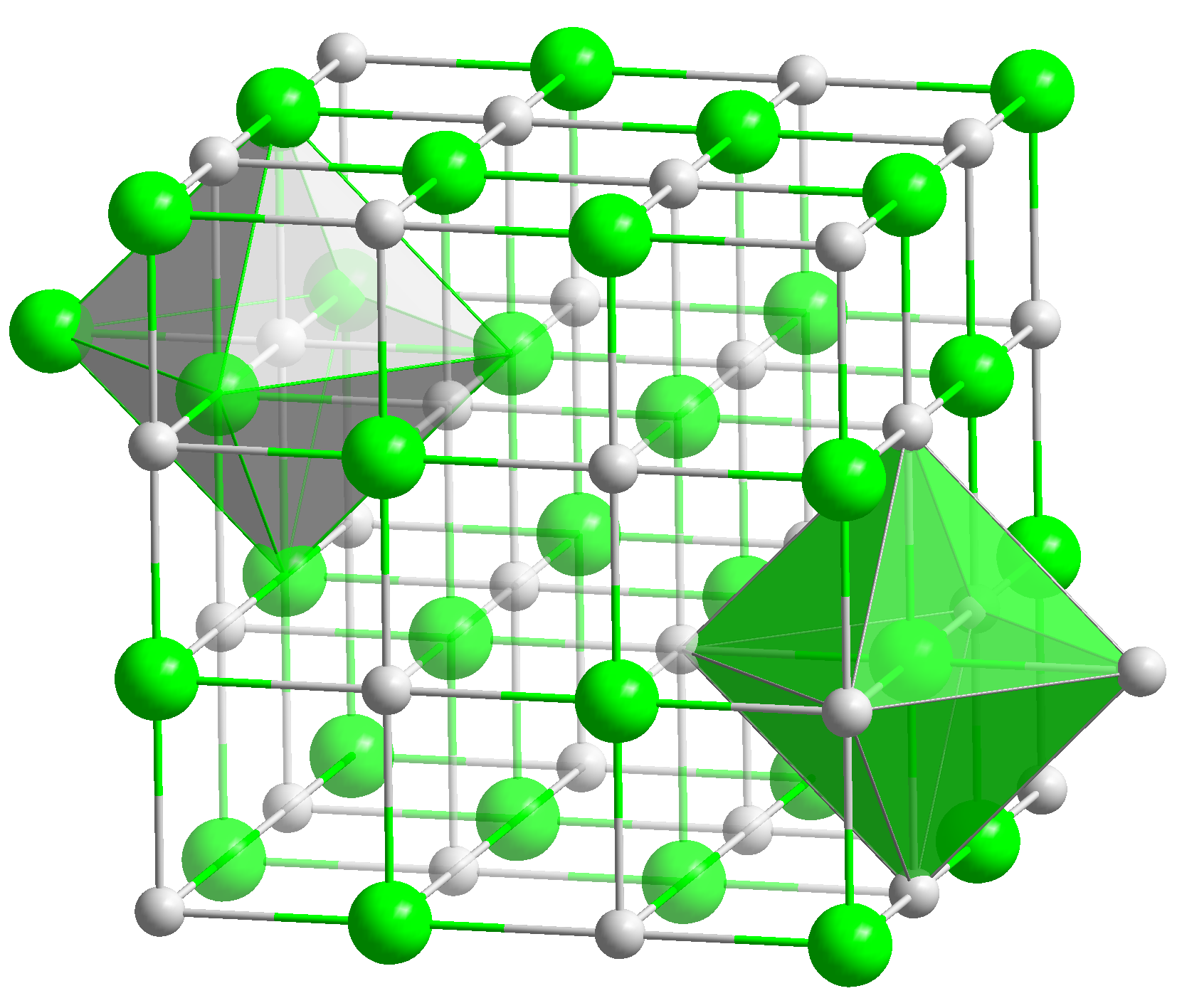
- Hafnium carbide

Identifiers
CAS Number	12069-85-1
3D model (JSmol)	Interactive image
ChemSpider	17340381
ECHA InfoCard	100.031.910
EC Number	235-114-1
PubChem CID	16212551
CompTox Dashboard (EPA)	DTXSID501027098 DTXSID00923528, DTXSID501027098
- InChI: InChI=1S/C.Hf/q-1;+1 Key: NVDNLVYQHRUYJA-UHFFFAOYSA-N; InChI=1/C.Hf/q-1;+1/rCHf/c1-2 Key: NVDNLVYQHRUYJA-GLWNXBRTAK
- SMILES: [Hf+]#[C-]

Properties
Chemical formula	HfC
Molar mass	190.50 g·mol^{−1}
Appearance	black odorless powder
Density	12.2 g/cm^{3}
Melting point	3,958 °C (7,156 °F; 4,231 K)
Solubility in water	insoluble

Structure
Crystal structure	Cubic crystal system, cF8
Space group	Fm3̅m, No. 225

Hazards
- GHS labelling
Pictograms	(GHS02: Flammable)
Signal word	Warning
Hazard statements	H228
NFPA 704 (fire diamond)	2 2 1
- Except where otherwise noted, data are given for materials in their standard state (at 25 °C [77 °F], 100 kPa). verify (what is ?) Infobox references

Hafnium carbide (HfC) is a chemical compound of hafnium and carbon.

== Properties ==
Previously the material was estimated to have a melting point of about 3,900 °C. More recent tests have been able to conclusively prove that the substance has an even higher melting point of 3,958 °C exceeding those of tantalum carbide and tantalum hafnium carbide which were both previously estimated to be higher. However, it has a low oxidation resistance, with the oxidation starting at temperatures as low as 430 °C. Experimental testing in 2018 confirmed the higher melting point yielding a result of 3,982 (±30°C) with a small possibility that the melting point may even exceed 4,000°C.

Hafnium carbide is usually carbon deficient and therefore its composition is often expressed as HfC_{x} (x = 0.5 to 1.0). It has a (rock-salt) face-centered cubic crystal structure at any value of x.

The magnetic properties of HfC_{x} change from paramagnetic for x ≤ 0.8 to diamagnetic at larger x. An inverse behavior (dia-paramagnetic transition with increasing x) is observed for TaC_{x}, despite its having the same crystal structure as HfC_{x}.

=== Hafnium carbonitride ===
Atomistic simulations conducted in 2015 predicted that a similar compound, hafnium carbonitride (HfCN), could have a melting point exceeding even that of hafnium carbide. Experimental evidence gathered in 2020 confirmed that it did indeed have a higher melting point exceeding 4,000 °C, with more recent ab initio molecular dynamics calculations predicting the HfC_{0.75}N_{0.22} phase to have a melting point as high as 4,110 ± 62 °C, highest known for any material.

== Preparation ==
Hafnium carbide powder is obtained by the reduction of hafnium(IV) oxide with carbon at 1,800 to 2,000 °C. A long processing time is required to remove all oxygen. Alternatively, high-purity HfC coatings can be obtained by chemical vapor deposition from a gas mixture of methane, hydrogen, and vaporized hafnium(IV) chloride.

== Applications ==
Because of the technical complexity and high cost of the synthesis, HfC has a very limited use, despite its favorable properties such as high hardness (greater than 9 Mohs) and melting point.

== See also ==
- Tantalum carbide
- Tantalum hafnium carbide
- Hafnium carbonitride
- Tungsten carbide
- Titanium carbide
- Zirconium carbide
- Silicon carbide
