= Tantalcarbide =

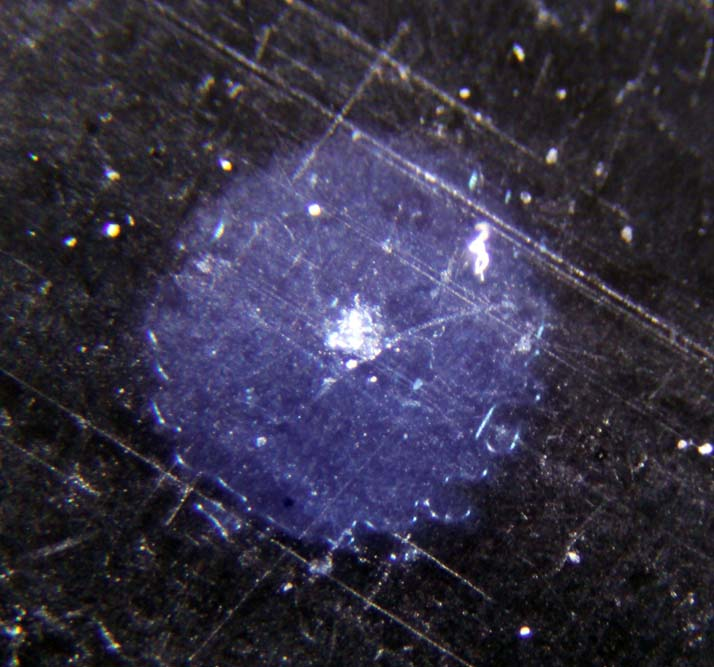
- Unpolished microprobe preparate with a 0.20 x 0.15 x 0.10 mm grain of bronze-pinkish tantalcarbide from the type and only known locality worldwide (Avrorinskii Placer, Aktai River, Baranchinsky Massif, Nizhnii Tagil, Sverdlovsk Oblast, Russian Federation), completely analyzed.

General
- Category: Carbide minerals
- Formula: TaC
- IMA symbol: Tcb
- Strunz classification: 1.AB.20
- Crystal system: Isometric
- Crystal class: Hexoctahedral (m3m); H-M symbol: (4/m 3 2/m)
- Unit cell: a = 4.446 ± 0.0005 Å b = 4.446 Å c = 4.446 Å

Identification
- Color: Bronze, yellow brown
- Crystal habit: Granular, tabular
- Fracture: Subconchoidal
- Tenacity: Brittle
- Mohs scale hardness: 6-7
- Luster: Sub Metallic
- Streak: White
- Diaphaneity: Opaque
- Specific gravity: 14.5

Tantalcarbide is a rare mineral of tantalum carbide with formula TaC. With a molecular weight of 192.96 g/mol, its primary constituents are tantalum (93.78%) and carbon (6.22%), and has an isometric crystal system. It generally exhibits a bronze or brown to yellow color. On the Mohs hardness scale it registers as a 6–7. Tantalcarbide is generally found in a granular state. It is extremely dense at 14.6 g/$cm^3$. Sub-conchoidal fracturing is exhibited.

Specimens are extremely rare in nature. It is the only known mineral to exhibit the composition of TaC.

Tantalum carbide powder is used for many real world applications. Generally however it is not produced from the mineral tantalcarbide due to the rarity. Instead it is prepared by other means.

== Natural occurrence ==
Tantalcarbide in its natural state is extremely rare. Most specimens have been found in the middle Urals or mines in Italy. The first documented specimen was discovered in the Nizhnetagilsky District in the Middle Urals, by P. Walther in 1909.

== Etymology ==
The name tantalcarbide is quite clearly a mention to its primary constituents of tantalum and carbon. However it was originally thought to be native tantalum in 1909. It was renamed to tantalum carbide in 1926, then renamed to tantalcarbide in 1966.

== Properties ==
Tantalcarbide is hexoctahedral, with a space group of Fm3m. Its generally found as granular or tabular crystals. Quite often it is found mixed with other sands.

It has an extremely high melting point of around 3800 °C, although actually testing of this has not been documented. Tantalcarbide is isostructural with niobocarbide, and is coincidentally found in the same localities. Niobocarbide is composed of niobium and carbon.

== Use and applications ==
Tantalcarbide is found in too small of quantities for it be used commercially. However tantalum carbide powders are used for tools, or cermet.
