= Titanium carbide =

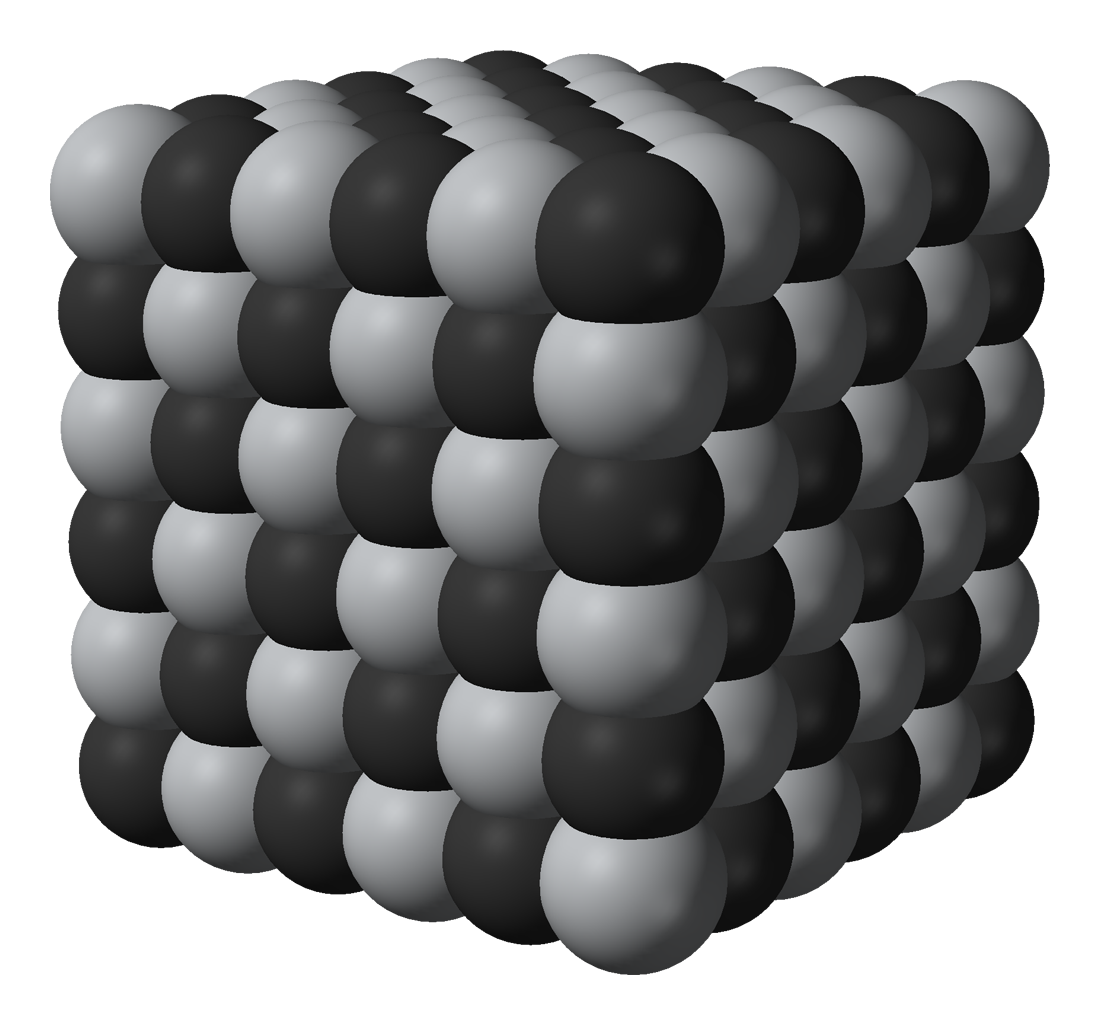

Names
- IUPAC name titanium carbide
- Other names titanium(IV) carbide

Identifiers
CAS Number	12070-08-5
3D model (JSmol)	Interactive image
ChemSpider	26995141
ECHA InfoCard	100.031.916
EC Number	235-120-4
PubChem CID	4226345
UNII	7SHTGW5HBI
CompTox Dashboard (EPA)	DTXSID10583531
- InChI: InChI=1S/C.Ti Key: CYKMNKXPYXUVPR-UHFFFAOYSA-N
- SMILES: [C].[Ti]

Properties
Chemical formula	TiC
Molar mass	59.878 g·mol^{−1}
Appearance	black crystalline powder
Density	4.93 g/cm^{3}
Melting point	3,160 °C (5,720 °F; 3,430 K)
Boiling point	4,820 °C (8,710 °F; 5,090 K)
Solubility in water	Insoluble
Magnetic susceptibility (χ)	+8.0·10^{−6} cm^{3}/mol

Structure
Crystal structure	Cubic, cF8
Space group	Fm3̅m, No. 225
Coordination geometry	Octahedral

Related compounds
Related compounds	Zirconium carbide; Hafnium carbide; Beryllium carbide; Vanadium carbide; Tungsten carbide; Molybdenum carbide; Diamond; Silicon carbide; Titanium nitride
- Except where otherwise noted, data are given for materials in their standard state (at 25 °C [77 °F], 100 kPa). verify (what is ?) Infobox references

Titanium carbide, TiC, is an extremely hard (Mohs 9–9.5) refractory ceramic material, similar to tungsten carbide. It has the appearance of black powder with the sodium chloride (face-centered cubic) crystal structure.

It occurs in nature as a form of the very rare mineral khamrabaevite (Russian: Хамрабаевит) - (Ti,V,Fe)C. It was discovered in 1984 on Mount Arashan in the Chatkal District, USSR (modern Kyrgyzstan), near the Uzbek border. The mineral was named after Ibragim Khamrabaevich Khamrabaev, director of Geology and Geophysics of Tashkent, Uzbekistan. Its crystals as found in nature range in size from 0.1 to 0.3 mm.

== Physical properties ==
Titanium carbide has an elastic modulus of approximately 400 GPa and a shear modulus of 188 GPa.

Titanium carbide is soluble in solid titanium oxide, with a range of compositions which are collectively named "titanium oxycarbide" and created by carbothermic reduction of the oxide.

== Manufacturing and machining ==
Tool bits without tungsten content can be made of titanium carbide in nickel-cobalt matrix cermet, enhancing the cutting speed, precision, and smoothness of the workpiece.

The resistance to wear, corrosion, and oxidation of a tungsten carbide–cobalt material can be increased by adding 6–30% of titanium carbide to tungsten carbide. This forms a solid solution that is more brittle and susceptible to breakage.

Titanium carbide can be etched with reactive-ion etching.

== Applications ==
Titanium carbide is used in preparation of cermets, which are frequently used to machine steel materials at high cutting speed. It is also used as an abrasion-resistant surface coating on metal parts, such as tool bits and watch mechanisms. Titanium carbide is also used as a heat shield coating for atmospheric reentry of spacecraft.

7075 aluminium alloy (AA7075) is almost as strong as steel, but weighs one third as much. Using thin AA7075 rods with TiC nanoparticles allows larger alloys pieces to be welded without phase-segregation induced cracks.

== See also ==
- Metallocarbohedryne, a family of metal-carbon clusters including Ti_{8}C_{12}
