= Europium(II) titanate =

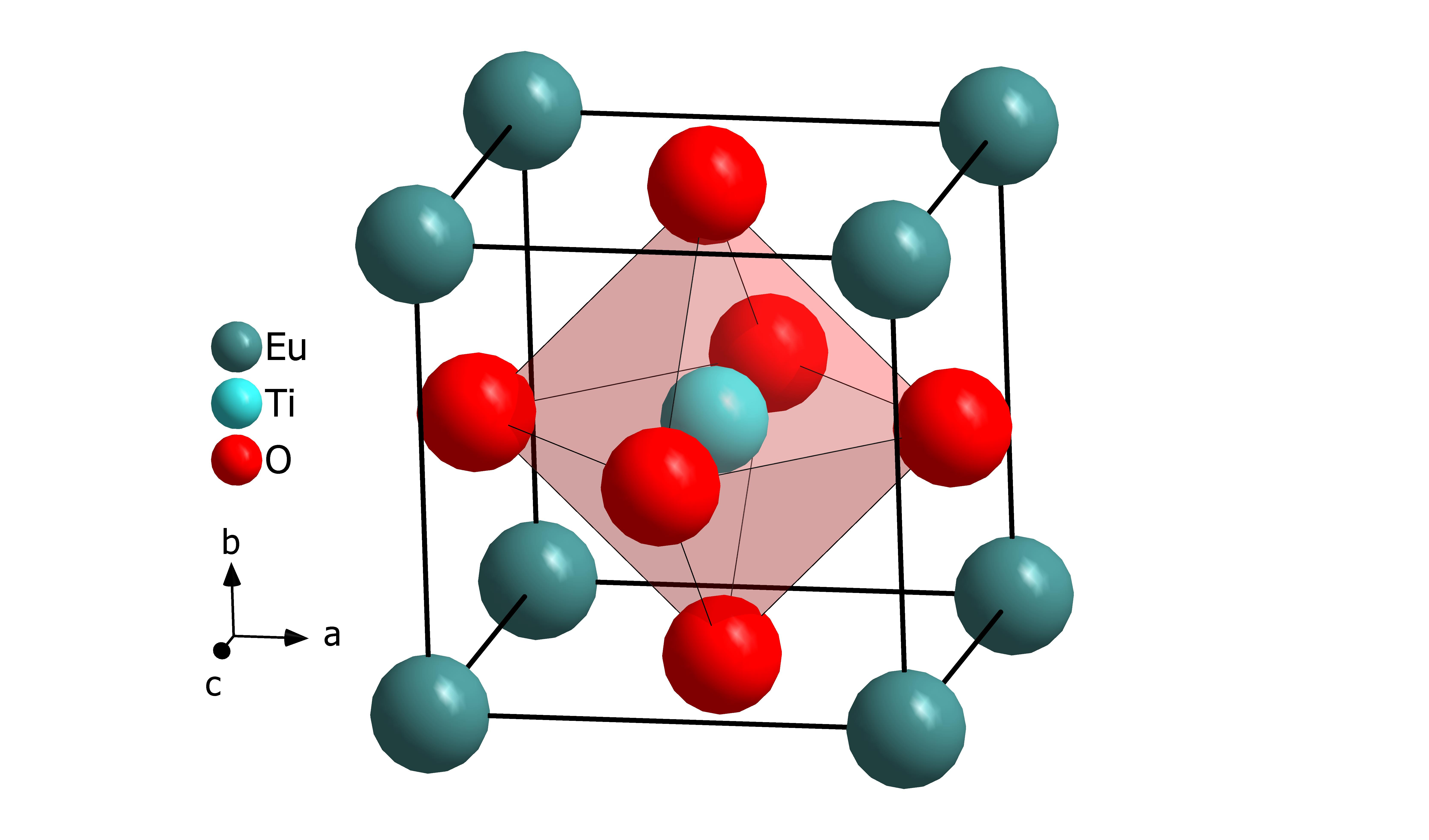

Names
- IUPAC name Europium(II) titanate
- Other names Europium titante Europium titanium oxide

Identifiers
CAS Number	12020-61-0
3D model (JSmol)	Interactive image
ChemSpider	64878787
- InChI: InChI=1S/Eu.3O.Ti/q+2;;;;-2 Key: GJVYVJCMLXKLDJ-UHFFFAOYSA-N
- SMILES: O=[Ti-2](=O)(=O).[Eu+2]

Properties
Chemical formula	EuTiO_{3}
Molar mass	247.829g
Appearance	Black Solid

Hazards
- GHS labelling
Signal word	Warning

Related compounds
Other anions	Europium(II) hydride Europium(II) sulfate Europium(II) sulfide
Related compounds	Europium barium titanate
- Except where otherwise noted, data are given for materials in their standard state (at 25 °C [77 °F], 100 kPa). Infobox references

Europium(II) titanate is a black mixed oxide of europium and titanium, with the chemical formula of EuTiO_{3}. It crystallizes in the perovskite structure.

== History ==
EuTiO_{3} was first examined in 1966 by McGuire, Shafer, Joenk, Halperin and Pickart where the magnetic structure was examined. This compound received more attention at the beginning of the 21st century (2001 to 2015) due to the low-temperature phase transition to antiferromagnetic behavior at T_{N} = 5.5 K, which has a significant influence on the dielectric constant.

== Preparation ==
Dried Eu_{2}O_{3} and Ti_{2}O_{3} are mixed 1:1 and reacted in an argon atmosphere at 1400 °C:

Eu_{2}O_{3} + Ti_{2}O_{3} → 2 EuTiO_{3}

The europium is reduced and the titanium is oxidized.

== Properties ==
Europium(II) titanate has two different crystal forms depending on the temperature. The phase transition occurs at 282 K. The low temperature form crystallizes in the tetragonal space group I4/mcm (space group No. 140) with the lattice parameters a = 551.92(2) pm, c = 781.64(8) pm (measured at 90 K). The higher temperature form has a cubic form with Pm3̅m (space group No. 221) with lattice parameter a = 390.82(2) pm (measured at 300 K). The transition temperature of the crystal structure from the low-temperature to the high-temperature phase increases with increasing pressure. The compound becomes G-type antiferromagnetic below 5.5 K. The specific heat capacity is 125 J·mol^{−1}·K^{−1} (at 600 K). 125 J·mol^{−1}·K^{−1}290 K is 7,6 W·m^{−1}·K^{−1} and the electrical conductivity is 10^{5} (Ω·m)^{−1}(at 330 K).
