= Niobium carbide =

- Niobium carbide

Identifiers
CAS Number	NbC: 12069-94-2; Nb_{2}C: 12011-99-3
3D model (JSmol)	NbC: Interactive image; Interactive image
ECHA InfoCard	100.031.913
EC Number	NbC: 235-117-8
PubChem CID	NbC: 159431 has wrong formula; Nb_{2}C: 165961 has wrong formula
CompTox Dashboard (EPA)	NbC: DTXSID00893838
- InChI: NbC: InChI=1S/C.Nb; Nb_{2}C: InChI=1S/C.2Nb
- SMILES: NbC: [C].[Nb]; [C].[Nb].[Nb]

Properties
Chemical formula	NbC
Molar mass	104.917 g/mol
Density	7.820 g/cm^{3}
Melting point	3,608 °C (6,526 °F; 3,881 K)

Structure
Crystal structure	Cubic (rock salt structure), Fm3̅m, cF8)

Related compounds
Related Refractory ceramic materials	zirconium nitride, tantalum carbide, zirconium carbide
- Except where otherwise noted, data are given for materials in their standard state (at 25 °C [77 °F], 100 kPa). verify (what is ?) Infobox references

Niobium carbide (NbC and Nb_{2}C) is an extremely hard refractory ceramic material, commercially used in tool bits for cutting tools. It is usually processed by sintering and is a frequent additive as grain growth inhibitor in cemented carbides. It has the appearance of a brown-gray metallic powder with purple lustre. It is highly corrosion resistant.

== Preparation ==
Niobium carbide can be produced by heating niobium(V) oxide with coke under vacuum at approximately 1800 °C:

Nb_{2}O_{5} + 7 C → 2 NbC + 5 CO

== Properties and uses ==
Niobium carbide has a Young's modulus of approximately 452 GPa, and a shear modulus of 182 GPa. It has a Poisson's ratio of 0.227.

Niobium carbide is a frequent intentional product in microalloyed steels due to its extremely low solubility product in austenite, the lowest of all the refractory metal carbides. This means that micrometre-sized precipitates of NbC are virtually insoluble in steels at all processing temperatures and their location at grain boundaries helps prevent excessive grain growth in these steels. This is of enormous benefit, and the cornerstone of microalloyed steels, because it is their uniform, very fine grain size that ensures both toughness and strength. The only commonly occurring compound with a lower solubility and hence, greater potential for restricting the grain growth of steels is titanium nitride.

Depending on grain size, niobium carbide may burn at 200-800 °C in air. A layer of niobium carbide can be created by chemical vapor deposition. Zirconium carbide and niobium carbide can be used as refractory coatings in nuclear reactors.

== Applications ==
Niobium carbide has been investigated as a potential material for nuclear thermal propulsion (NTP) reactor cores. NTP systems can provide a higher specific impulse than conventional chemical rockets while producing substantially greater thrust than nuclear electric propulsion. One of the principal challenges in developing such reactors is identifying fuel and structural materials capable of withstanding the extreme temperatures and corrosive hydrogen environment within the reactor core.

As a transition metal carbide, niobium carbide combines a very high melting point with good thermal conductivity and resistance to high-temperature corrosion, properties that have led to its study for this application. It may also be used in solid solutions with other refractory carbides, including zirconium carbide, tantalum carbide, and titanium carbide. Such carbide mixtures are of interest because of their high melting temperatures, compatibility with hot hydrogen, and ability to form solid solutions with uranium carbide, a candidate nuclear fuel for NTP reactors. Multicomponent carbide solid solutions have additionally been investigated as a means of improving properties such as fracture toughness.

== Natural occurrence ==
Niobium carbide occurs naturally as niobocarbide. This is an extremely rare mineral, and has been found in Sverdlovsk Oblast, Russia.
