= Europium barium titanate =

Names
- Other names Barium europium titanium oxide

Identifiers
CAS Number	(Ba_{0.5}Eu_{0.5}TiO_{3}): 1224510-31-9
3D model (JSmol)	(Ba_{0.5}Eu_{0.5}TiO_{3}): Interactive image
- InChI: (Ba_{0.5}Eu_{0.5}TiO_{3}): InChI=1S/Ba.Eu.6O.2Ti/q2*+2;;;4*-1;; Key: GZQIPLSRJTXTGZ-UHFFFAOYSA-N
- SMILES: (Ba_{0.5}Eu_{0.5}TiO_{3}): [Ba+2].[Eu+2].[O-][Ti](=O)[O-].[O-][Ti](=O)[O-]

Properties
Chemical formula	(Ba,Eu)TiO_{3}
- Except where otherwise noted, data are given for materials in their standard state (at 25 °C [77 °F], 100 kPa). Infobox references

Europium barium titanate is a chemical compound composed of barium, europium, titanium, and oxygen. It is magnetic and ferroelectric at 1.5 K.

It is a ceramic material which was used in 2010 experiments on a new theory on baryon asymmetry.
