= Vanadium carbide =

Extremely hard refractory ceramic material

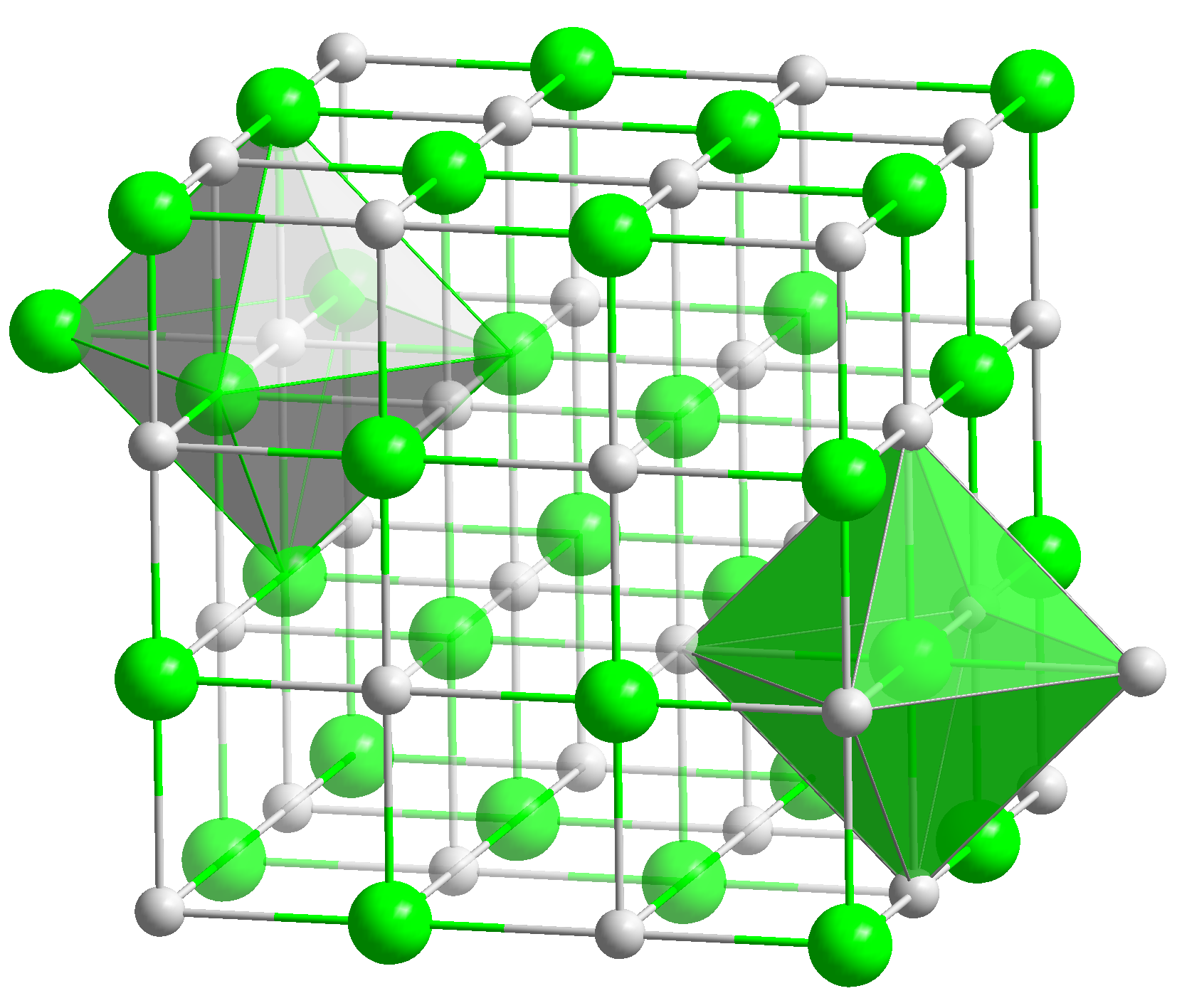
- Vanadium carbide

Names
- Other names Vanadium Carbon; Vanadium(IV) carbide

Identifiers
CAS Number	12070-10-9
3D model (JSmol)	Interactive image
ChemSpider	27472996
ECHA InfoCard	100.031.917
EC Number	235-122-5
PubChem CID	159387
CompTox Dashboard (EPA)	DTXSID80893139
- InChI: InChI=1S/C.V/q-1;+1 Key: ZLANVVMKMCTKMT-UHFFFAOYSA-N
- SMILES: [V+]#[C-]

Properties
Chemical formula	VC
Molar mass	62.953 g·mol^{−1}
Appearance	refractory black cubic crystals
Density	5.77 g/cm^{3}
Melting point	2,810 °C (5,090 °F; 3,080 K)
Solubility in water	insoluble

Structure
Crystal structure	cubic, cF8
Space group	Fm3̅m, No. 225

Related compounds
Related compounds	Niobium carbide; Tantalum carbide
- Except where otherwise noted, data are given for materials in their standard state (at 25 °C [77 °F], 100 kPa). verify (what is ?) Infobox references

Vanadium carbide is the inorganic compound with the formula VC. It is an extremely hard and refractory ceramic material. With a hardness of 9-9.5 Mohs, it is possibly the hardest metal-carbide known. It is of interest because it is prevalent in vanadium metal and alloys.

== Structure and preparation ==
Being isomorphous with vanadium monoxide, it crystallizes in the rock salt structure. Because VC and VO are miscible, samples of VC typically contain an impurity of the oxide. It is produced by heating vanadium oxides with carbon at around 1000 °C. Vanadium carbide can be formed in the (111) orientation, when formed by radio frequency magnetron sputtering. Although VC is thermodynamically stable, it converts to V_{2}C at higher temperatures. The crystalline structure is halite.

Vanadium carbide is used as an additive to cemented carbide, to refine the carbide crystals and thereby get an increased hardness of the inserts.

== Physical properties ==
Vanadium carbide has an elastic modulus of approximately 380 GPa.
