= Hafnium carbonitride =

Identifiers
3D model (JSmol)	Interactive image
- InChI: InChI=1S/C.2Hf.N Key: MANOWAVKGDAAGH-UHFFFAOYSA-N
- SMILES: [Hf].[Hf].[C].[N]

Properties
Chemical formula	CHf_{2}N
Molar mass	204.51 g/mol
Appearance	black odorless powder
Density	12.65–13.073 g/cm^{3}
Melting point	4,110 °C (7,430 °F; 4,380 K)
Solubility in water	insoluble
Thermal conductivity	19–24 W⋅m^{−1}⋅K^{−1}

Structure
Crystal structure	Cubic crystal system, cF8
Space group	Fm3̅m, No. 225
- Except where otherwise noted, data are given for materials in their standard state (at 25 °C [77 °F], 100 kPa). Infobox references

Hafnium carbonitride (HfCN) is an ultra-high temperature ceramic (UHTC) mixed anion compound composed of hafnium (Hf), carbon (C) and nitrogen (N).

Ab initio molecular dynamics calculations have predicted the HfCN (specifically the HfC_{0.75}N_{0.22} phase) to have a melting point of 4,110 ± 62 °C (4,048–4,172 °C, 7,318–7,542 °F, 4,321–4,445 K), the highest known for any material. Another approach based on the artificial neural network machine learning pointed towards a similar composition — HfC_{0.76}N_{0.24}. Experimental testing conducted in 2020 has confirmed a melting point above 4,000 °C (7,230 °F; 4,270 K), substantiating earlier predictions made with atomistic simulations in 2015.

== Properties ==
The HfC_{x}N_{1−x} has been assessed to possess the following properties:

- Thermal conductivity:
  - 19–24 W·m^{−1}·K^{−1} at room temperature,
  - 32–39 W·m^{−1}·K^{−1} at high temperature and with increased nitrogen content.
- Electrical conductivity: (149×10^{4})–(213×10^{4}) Ω^{−1} m^{−1}
- Plasticity limit: 2,000 °C (3,630 °F; 2,270 K) (Note: For HfC_{0.3}N_{0.7})
- Fusion enthalpy: 150 kJ/mol (36 kcal/mol)
- Flexural strength: (Note: For HfC_{0.7}N_{0.3})
  - 638 ± 28 MPa at room temperature,
  - 324 MPa at 1,000 °C (1,830 °F; 1,270 K),
  - 139 MPa at 1,600 °C (2,910 °F; 1,870 K),
  - 100 MPa at 2,000 °C (3,630 °F; 2,270 K).
- Fracture toughness: 6.73 ± 0.07 MPa·m^{1/2}, 4.7 ± 0.3 MPa·m^{1/2} (Note: For HfC_{0.5}N_{0.35})
- Vickers hardness: 19.08 GPa (2,767,000 psi), 21.3 ± 0.55 GPa (3,090,000 psi)
