= Tungsten carbide =

Hard, dense and stiff chemical compound

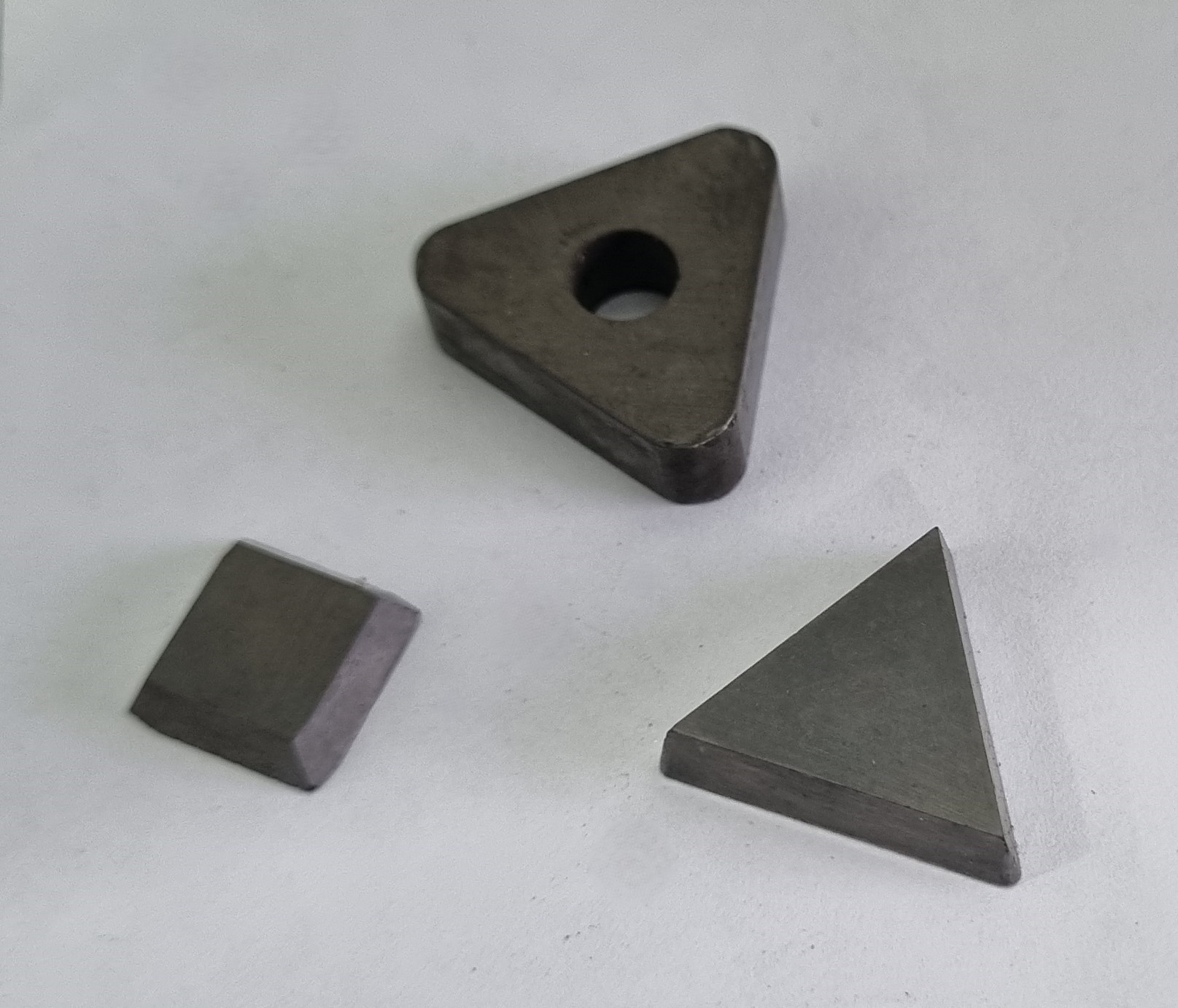
- Tungsten carbide inserts

Names
- IUPAC name Tungsten carbide
- Other names Tungsten(IV) carbide

Identifiers
| CAS Number | 12070-12-1 |
| 3D model (JSmol) | (W^{+}≡C^{−}): Interactive image |
| ChemSpider | 2006424 |
| ECHA InfoCard | 100.031.918 |
| EC Number | 235-123-0 |
| PubChem CID | 2724274 (W^{+}≡C^{−}) |
| RTECS number | YO7250000 |
| UNII | PKZ44S724L |
| UN number | 3178 |
| CompTox Dashboard (EPA) | DTXSID4029305 |
- InChI: InChI=1S/C.W/q-1;+1 Key: UONOETXJSWQNOL-UHFFFAOYSA-N
- SMILES: (W^{+}≡C^{−}): [C-]#[W+]

Properties
| Chemical formula | WC |
| Molar mass | 195.85 g·mol^{−1} |
| Appearance | Grey-black lustrous solid |
| Density | 15.6 g/cm^{3} |
| Melting point | 2,785–2,830 °C (5,045–5,126 °F; 3,058–3,103 K) |
| Boiling point | 6,000 °C (10,830 °F; 6,270 K) at 760 mmHg |
| Solubility in water | Insoluble |
| Solubility | Soluble in HNO_{3}, HF |
| Magnetic susceptibility (χ) | 1·10^{−5} cm^{3}/mol |
| Thermal conductivity | 110 W/(m·K) |

Structure
| Crystal structure | Hexagonal, hP2 |
| Space group | P6̅m2, No. 187 |
| Point group | 6̅m2 |
| Lattice constant | a = 2.906 Å, c = 2.837 Å α = 90°, β = 90°, γ = 120° |
| Molecular shape | Trigonal prismatic (center at C) |

Thermochemistry
| Heat capacity (C) | 39.8 J/(mol·K) |
| Std molar entropy (S^{⦵}_{298}) | 32.1 J/(mol·K) |

Related compounds
| Other anions | Tungsten boride; Tungsten nitride |
| Other cations | Molybdenum carbide; Titanium carbide; Silicon carbide |
- Except where otherwise noted, data are given for materials in their standard state (at 25 °C [77 °F], 100 kPa). verify (what is ?) Infobox references

Tungsten carbide (chemical formula: WC) is a carbide containing equal parts of tungsten and carbon atoms. In its most basic form, tungsten carbide is a fine gray powder, but it can be pressed and formed into shapes through sintering for use in industrial machinery, engineering facilities, molding blocks, cutting tools, chisels, abrasives, armor-piercing bullets and jewelry.

Tungsten carbide is approximately three times as stiff as steel, with a Young's modulus of approximately 530–700 GPa, and is twice as dense as steel. It is comparable with corundum (α-Al_{2}O_{3}) in hardness, approaching that of diamond, and can be polished and finished only with abrasives of superior hardness such as cubic boron nitride and diamond. Tungsten carbide tools can be operated at cutting speeds much higher than high-speed steel (a special steel blend for cutting tools).

Tungsten carbide powder was first synthesized by Henri Moissan in 1893, and the industrial production of the cemented form started 20 to 25 years later (between 1913 and 1918).

== Naming ==
Colloquially among workers in various industries (such as machining), tungsten carbide is often simply called carbide.

== Synthesis ==
=== Powder ===
Tungsten carbide powder is prepared by reaction of tungsten metal (or powder) and carbon at 1,400–2,000 °C. Other methods include a lower temperature fluid bed process that reacts either tungsten metal (or powder) or blue WO_{3} with CO/CO_{2} gas mixture and H_{2} gas between 900 and 1,200 °C.

WC can also be produced by heating WO_{3} with graphite, either directly at 900 °C or in hydrogen at 670 °C, followed by carburization in argon at 1,000 °C. Chemical vapor deposition methods that have been investigated include:

- reacting tungsten hexachloride with hydrogen (as a reducing agent) and methane (as the source of carbon) at 670 °C (943 K)

WCl_{6} + H_{2} + CH_{4} → WC + 6 HCl

- reacting tungsten hexafluoride with hydrogen (as reducing agent) and methanol (as source of carbon) at 350 °C (623 K)

WF_{6} + 2 H_{2} + CH_{3}OH → WC + 6 HF + H_{2}O

=== Cemented form ===
Solid tungsten carbide is prepared using techniques from powder metallurgy developed in the 1920s. Powdered tungsten carbide is mixed with another powdered metal, usually cobalt (alternatives include nickel and iron) which acts as a binder. The mixture is pressed, then sintered by heating it to temperatures of 1,400 °C (2,550 °F) to 1,600 °C (2,910 °F); the binder melts, wets, and partially dissolves the tungsten grains, binding them together. Cobalt-tungsten composites specifically are known by a number of trade names, including Widia and Carboloy.

== Chemical properties ==
There are two well-characterized compounds of tungsten and carbon: tungsten carbide, WC, and tungsten semicarbide, W_{2}C. Both compounds may be present in coatings and the proportions can depend on the coating method.

Another meta-stable compound of tungsten and carbon can be created by heating the WC phase to high temperatures using plasma, then quenching in inert gas (plasma spheroidization). This process causes macrocrystalline WC particles to spheroidize and results in the non-stoichiometric high temperature phase W_{1−x} existing in a meta-stable form at room temperature. The fine microstructure of this phase provides high hardness (2800–3500 HV) combined with good toughness when compared with other tungsten carbide compounds. The meta-stable nature of this compound results in reduced high temperature stability.

At high temperatures WC decomposes to tungsten and carbon and this can occur during high-temperature thermal spray, e.g., in high velocity oxygen fuel (HVOF) and high energy plasma (HEP) methods.

Oxidation of WC starts at 500–600 °C (773–873 K). It is resistant to acids and is only attacked by hydrofluoric acid/nitric acid (HF/HNO_{3}) mixtures above room temperature. It reacts with fluorine gas at room temperature and chlorine above 400 °C (673 K) and is unreactive to dry H_{2} up to its melting point. Finely powdered WC oxidizes readily in hydrogen peroxide aqueous solutions. At high temperatures and pressures it reacts with aqueous sodium carbonate forming sodium tungstate, a procedure used for recovery of scrap cemented carbide due to its selectivity.

== Physical properties ==
Tungsten carbide has a high melting point at 2,780 °C (3,050 K), a boiling point of 6,000 °C (6,270 K) when under a pressure equivalent to 1 standard atmosphere (101.325 kilopascals), a thermal conductivity of 110 W/(m·K), and a coefficient of thermal expansion of 5.5 μm/m·K.

Tungsten carbide is extremely hard, ranking about 9.0–9.5 on the Mohs scale, and with a Vickers number of around 2600. It has a Young's modulus of approximately 530–700 GPa, a bulk modulus of 379–381 GPa, and a shear modulus of 274 GPa. It has an ultimate tensile strength of 344 MPa, an ultimate compression strength of about 2.7 GPa and a Poisson's ratio of 0.31 .

The speed of a longitudinal pressure wave (the speed of sound) through a thin rod of tungsten carbide is 6220 m/s.

Tungsten carbide's low electrical resistivity of about 0.2 μΩ·m is comparable with that of some metals (e.g. vanadium 0.2 μΩ·m).

WC is readily wetted by both molten nickel and cobalt. Investigation of the phase diagram of the W-C-Co system shows that WC and Co form a pseudo binary eutectic. The phase diagram also shows that there are so-called η-carbides with composition (W,Co)_{6}C that can be formed and the brittleness of these phases makes control of the carbon content in WC-Co cemented carbides important. In the presence of a molten phase such as cobalt, abnormal grain growth is known to occur in the sintering of tungsten carbide, with this having significant effects on the performance of the product material.

== Structure ==
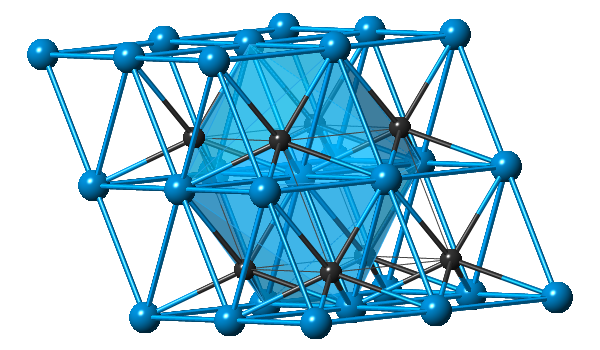
α-Tungsten carbide in the unit cell

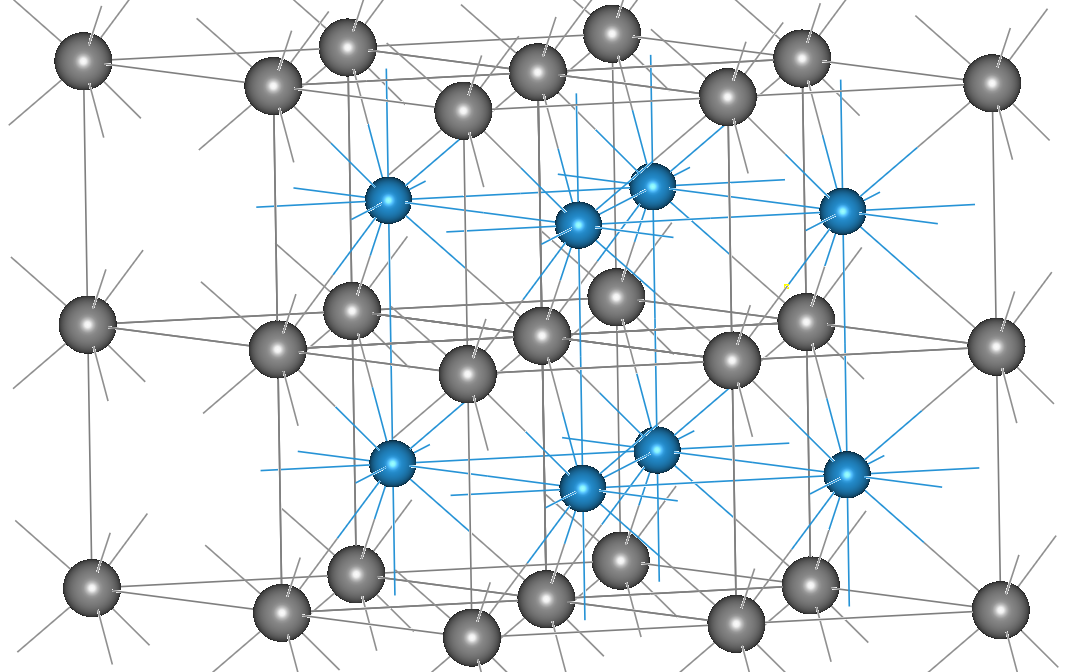
α-WC structure, carbon atoms are gray.

There are two forms of WC, a hexagonal form, α-WC (hP2, space group P6̅m2, No. 187), and a cubic high-temperature form, β-WC, which has the rock salt structure. The hexagonal form can be visualized as made up of a simple hexagonal lattice of metal atoms of layers lying directly over one another (i.e. not close packed), with carbon atoms filling half the interstices giving both tungsten and carbon a regular trigonal prismatic, 6 coordination. From the unit cell dimensions the following bond lengths can be determined: The distance between the tungsten atoms in a hexagonally packed layer is 291 pm, the shortest distance between tungsten atoms in adjoining layers is 284 pm, and the tungsten carbon bond length is 220 pm. The tungsten-carbon bond length is therefore comparable to the single bond in W(CH_{3})_{6} (218 pm) in which there is strongly distorted trigonal prismatic coordination of tungsten.

Molecular WC has been investigated and this gas phase species has a bond length of 171 pm for ^{184}W^{12}C.

== Applications ==
=== Cutting tools for machining ===
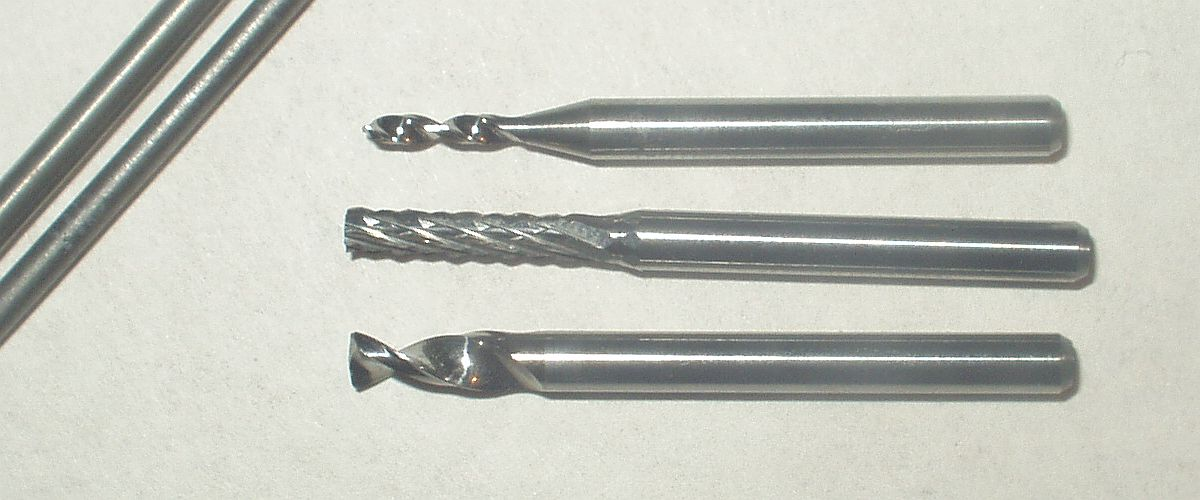
Cemented carbide drill and end mills

Sintered tungsten carbide–cobalt cutting tools are very abrasion resistant and can also withstand higher temperatures than standard high-speed steel (HSS) tools. Carbide cutting surfaces are often used for machining tough materials such as carbon steel or stainless steel, and in applications where steel tools would wear quickly, such as high-quantity and high-precision production. Because carbide tools maintain a sharp cutting edge better than steel tools, they generally produce a better finish on parts, and their temperature resistance allows faster machining. The material is usually called cemented carbide, solid carbide, hardmetal or tungsten-carbide cobalt. It is a metal matrix composite, where tungsten carbide particles are the aggregate, and metallic cobalt serves as the matrix. It has been found wear and oxidation properties of cemented carbide can be improved by replacing cobalt with iron aluminide. Using iron also reduces cost, as cobalt is particularly expensive, but the mixing is best done with resonant acoustic mixing.

=== Ammunition ===
Tungsten carbide, in its monolithic sintered form, or much more often in cemented tungsten carbide cobalt composite (see above), is often used in armor-piercing ammunition, especially where depleted uranium is not available or is politically unacceptable. W_{2}C projectiles were first used by German Luftwaffe tank-hunter squadrons in World War II. However, owing to the limited German reserves of tungsten, W_{2}C material was reserved for making machine tools and small numbers of projectiles. It is an effective penetrator due to its combination of great hardness and very high density.

Tungsten carbide ammunition is now generally of the sabot type. SLAP, or saboted light armour penetrator, where a plastic sabot discards at the barrel muzzle, is one of the primary types of saboted small arms ammunition. Non-discarding jackets, regardless of the jacket material, are not perceived as sabots but as bullets. Both of the designs are, however, common in designated light armor-piercing small arms ammunition. Discarding sabots such as are used with M1A1 Abrams main gun are more commonplace in precision high-velocity gun ammunition.

=== Mining and foundation drilling ===
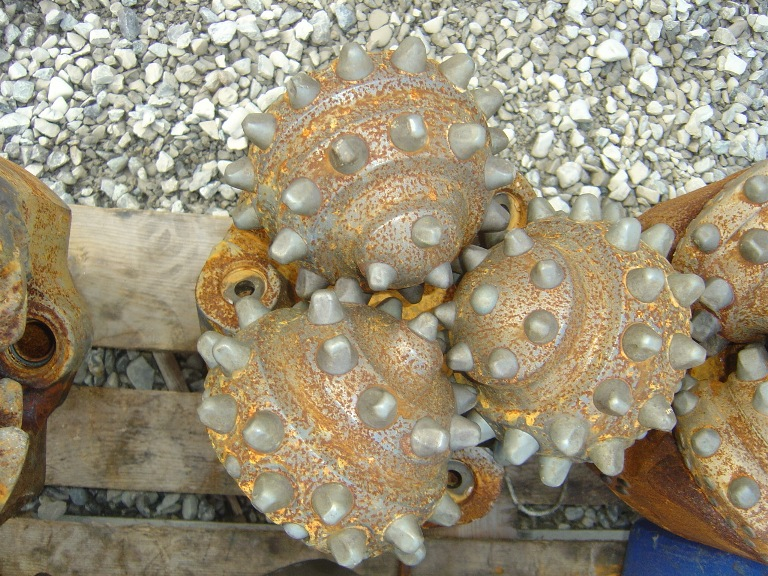
A tricone roller cone assembly from a raiseboring reamer, showing the protruding tungsten carbide buttons inset into the rollers

Tungsten carbide is used extensively in mining in top hammer rock drill bits, downhole hammers, roller-cutters, long wall plough chisels, long wall shearer picks, raiseboring reamers, and tunnel boring machines. In these applications it is also used for wear and corrosion resistant components in inlet control for well screens, sub-assemblies, seal rings and bushings common in oil and gas drilling. It is generally utilised as a button insert, mounted in a surrounding matrix of steel that forms the substance of the bit. As the tungsten carbide button is worn away the softer steel matrix containing it is also worn away, exposing yet more button insert.

=== Nuclear ===
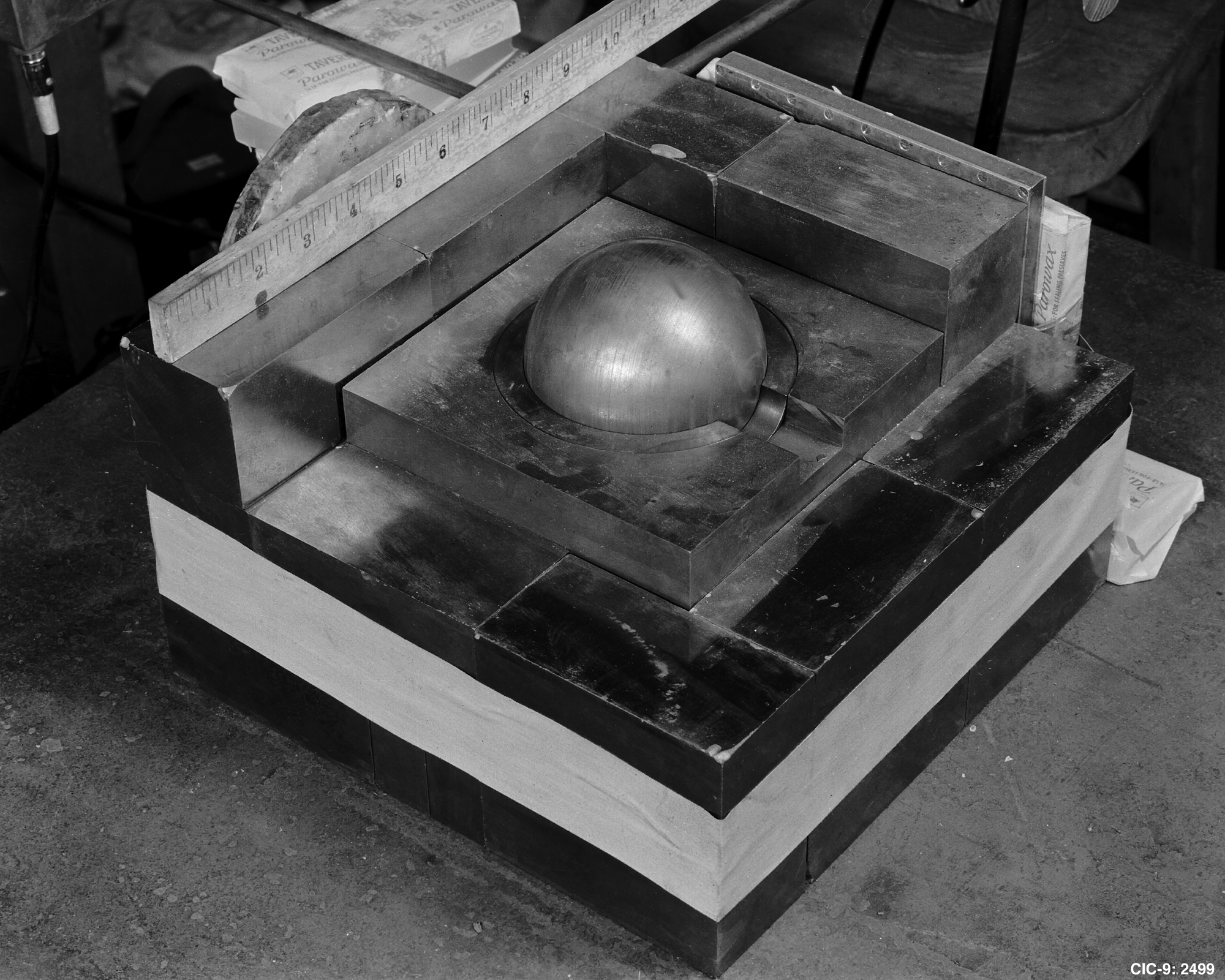
A re-creation of the experiment involved in the 1945 demon core incident. The sphere of plutonium is surrounded by tungsten carbide blocks acting as neutron reflectors.

Tungsten carbide is also an effective neutron reflector and as such was used during early investigations into nuclear chain reactions, particularly for weapons. A criticality accident occurred at Los Alamos National Laboratory on 21 August 1945 when Harry Daghlian accidentally dropped a tungsten carbide brick onto a plutonium sphere, known as the demon core, causing the subcritical mass to go supercritical with the reflected neutrons. He fell into a coma and died 25 days after the accident.

=== Sports usage ===
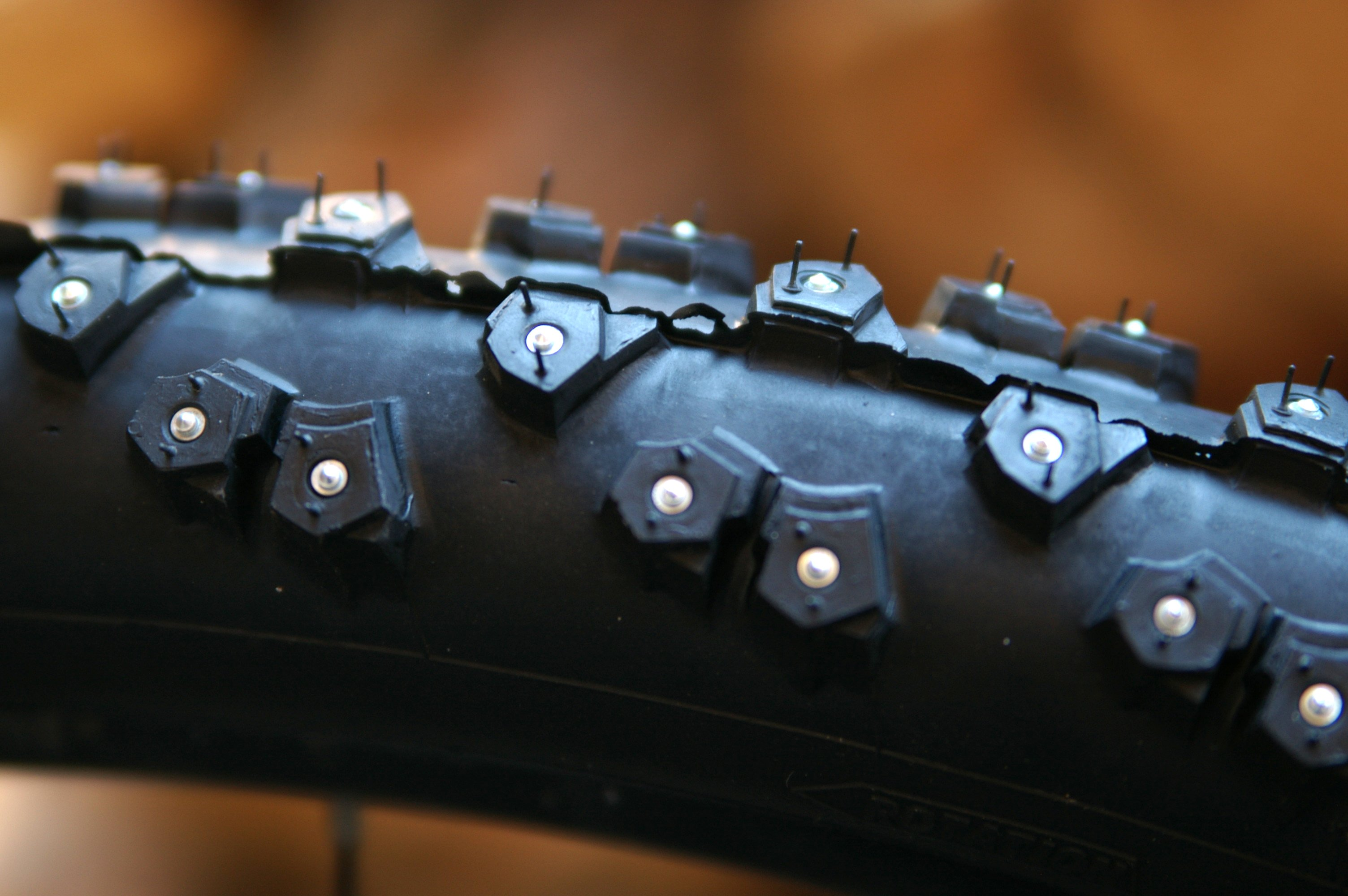
A Nokian bicycle tire with tungsten carbide spikes. The spikes are surrounded by aluminium.

Trekking poles, used by many hikers for balance and to reduce pressure on leg joints, generally use carbide tips in order to gain traction when placed on hard surfaces (like rock); carbide tips last much longer than other types of tip.

While ski pole tips are generally not made of carbide, since they do not need to be especially hard even to break through layers of ice, rollerski tips usually are. Roller skiing emulates cross country skiing and is used by many skiers to train during warm weather months.

Sharpened carbide tipped spikes (known as studs) can be inserted into the drive tracks of snowmobiles. These studs enhance traction on icy surfaces. Longer v-shaped segments fit into grooved rods called wear rods under each snowmobile ski. The relatively sharp carbide edges enhance steering on harder icy surfaces. The carbide tips and segments reduce wear encountered when the snowmobile must cross roads and other abrasive surfaces.

Car, motorcycle and bicycle tires with tungsten carbide studs provide better traction on ice. They are generally preferred to steel studs because of their superior resistance to wear.

Tungsten carbide is used in farriery (shoeing of horses) to improve traction, especially on slippery surfaces such as roads or ice. Carbide-tipped hoof nails may be used to attach horseshoes. In the United States, a material commonly called "borium" – tungsten carbide chips in a matrix of softer metal such as bronze or mild steel – may be welded to small areas on the bottom of horseshoes before fitting.

=== Surgical instruments and medical ===
Tungsten carbide is also used for making surgical instruments meant for open surgery (scissors, forceps, hemostats, blade-handles, etc.) and laparoscopic surgery (graspers, scissors/cutter, needle holder, cautery, etc.). They are much costlier than their stainless-steel counterparts and require delicate handling, but give better performance.

=== Jewelry ===
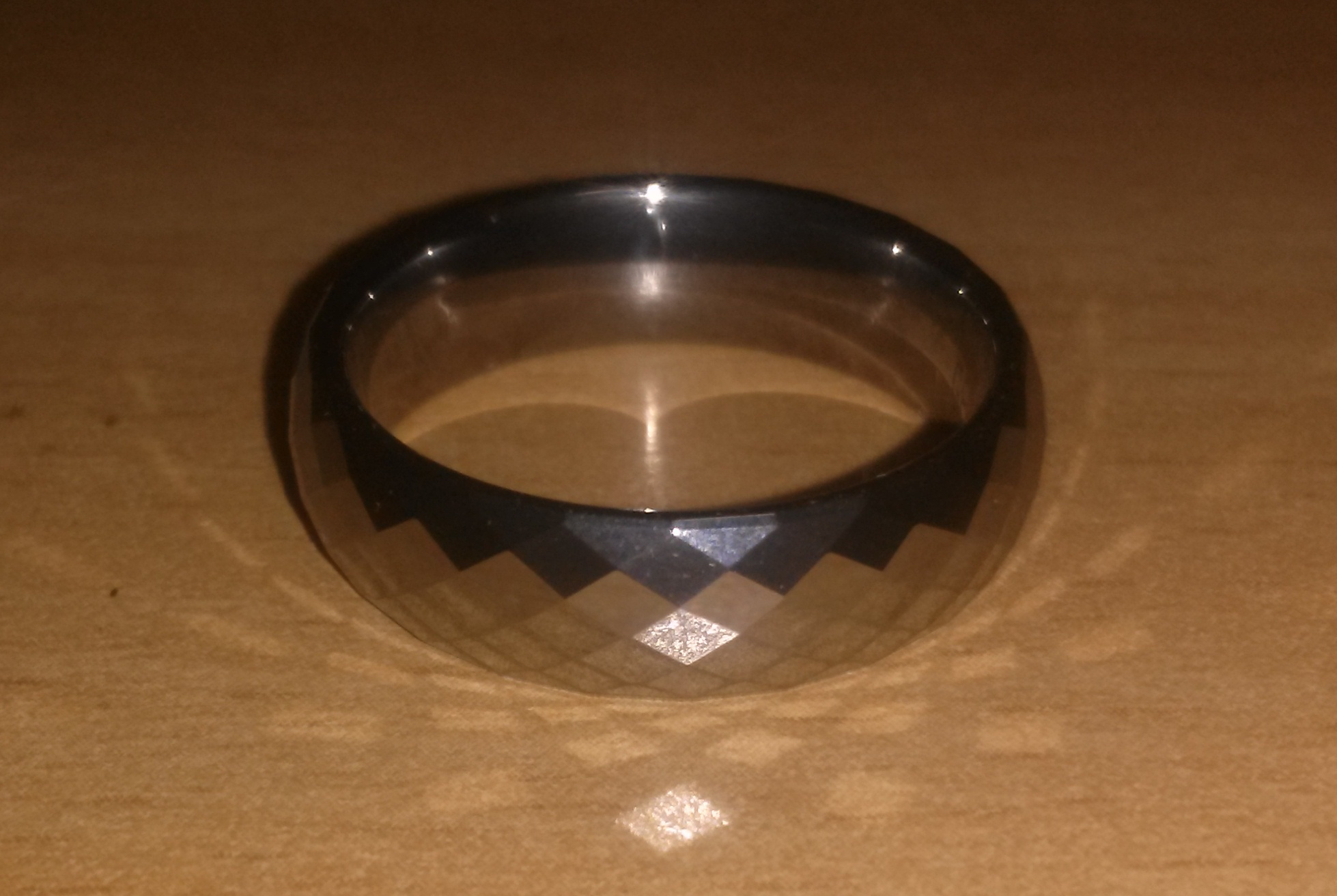
Tungsten carbide ring

Tungsten carbide, typically in the form of a cemented carbide (carbide particles brazed together by metal), has become a popular material in the bridal jewelry industry due to its extreme hardness and high resistance to scratching. Even with high-impact resistance, this extreme hardness also means that it can occasionally be shattered. Some consider this useful, since an impact would shatter a tungsten ring, quickly removing it, where precious metals would bend flat and require cutting. Tungsten carbide is roughly 10 times harder than 18 k gold. In addition to its design and high polish, part of its attraction to consumers is its technical nature. Special tools, such as locking pliers, may be required if such a ring must be removed quickly (e.g. due to medical emergency following a hand injury accompanied by swelling).

=== Other ===
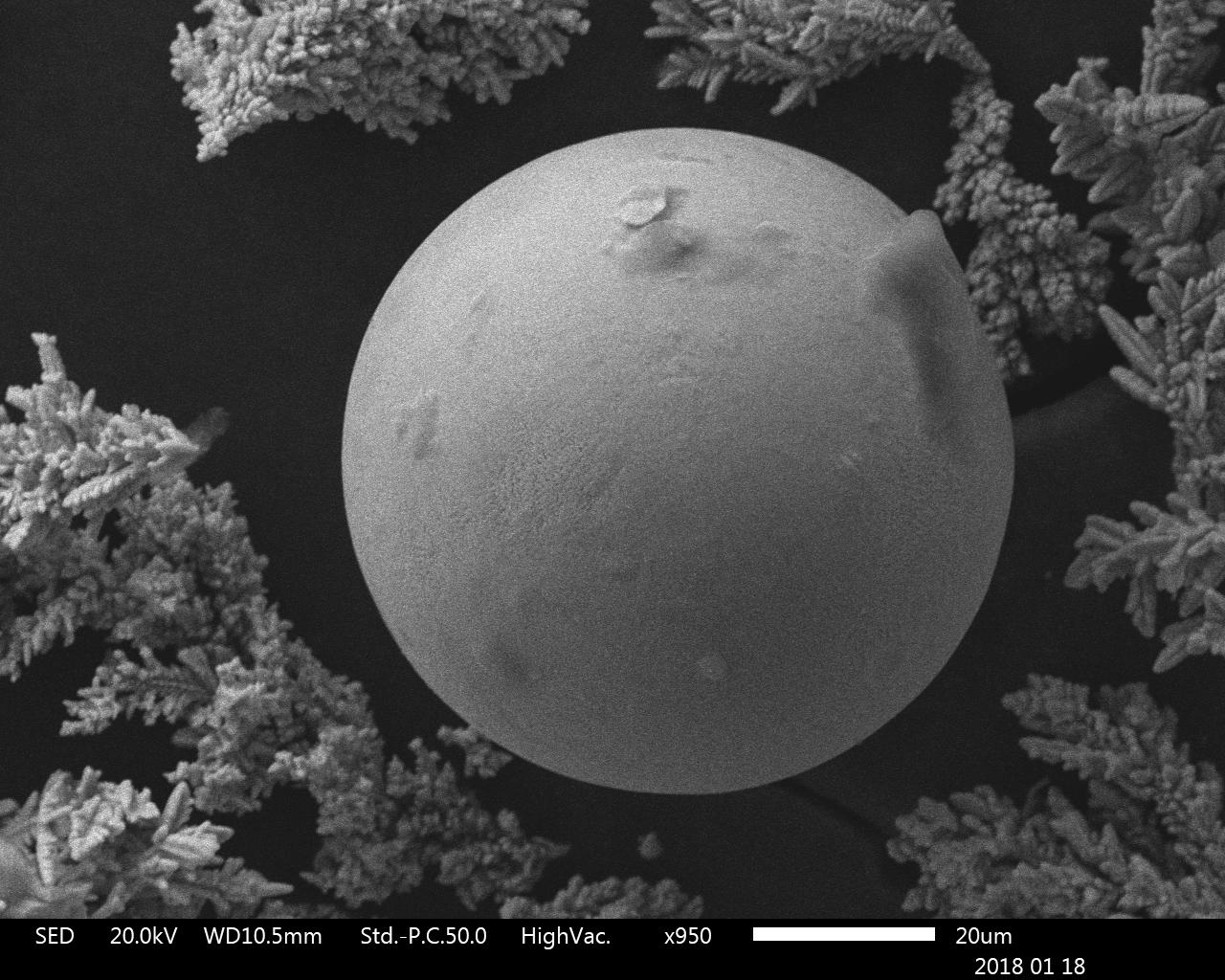
Spherical tungsten carbide under scanning electron microscope, magnification ×950, material laboratory

Tungsten carbide is widely used to make the rotating ball in the tips of ballpoint pens that disperse ink during writing.

English guitarist Martin Simpson uses a custom-made tungsten carbide guitar slide, which gives it superior sustain and volume.

Tungsten carbide has been investigated for its potential use as a catalyst and it has been found to resemble platinum in its catalysis of the production of water from hydrogen and oxygen at room temperature, the reduction of tungsten trioxide by hydrogen in the presence of water, and the isomerisation of 2,2-dimethylpropane to 2-methylbutane. It has been proposed as a replacement for the iridium catalyst in hydrazine-powered satellite thrusters.

A tungsten carbide coating has been utilized on brake discs in high performance automotive applications to improve performance, increase service intervals and reduce brake dust.

== Toxicity ==
The primary health risks associated with tungsten carbide relate to inhalation of dust, leading to silicosis-like pulmonary fibrosis. Cobalt-cemented tungsten carbide is also anticipated to be a human carcinogen by the American National Toxicology Program.

== Cited sources ==
- Kurlov, Alexey S.; Gusev, Aleksandr I. (2013). Tungsten Carbides: Structure, Properties and Application in Hardmetals. Springer Science & Business Media. doi:10.1007/978-3-319-00524-9. ISBN 978-3-319-00524-9. LCCN 2013942113. S2CID 136700223.
