= Ceramic matrix composite =

Composite material consisting of ceramic fibers in a ceramic matrix

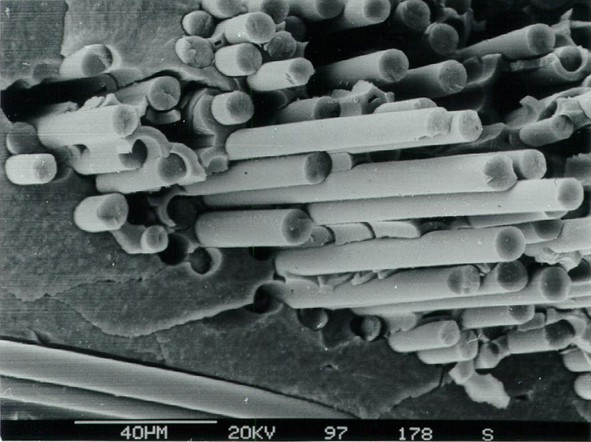
Fracture surface of a fiber-reinforced ceramic composed of SiC fibers and SiC matrix. The fiber pull-out mechanism shown is the key to CMC properties.

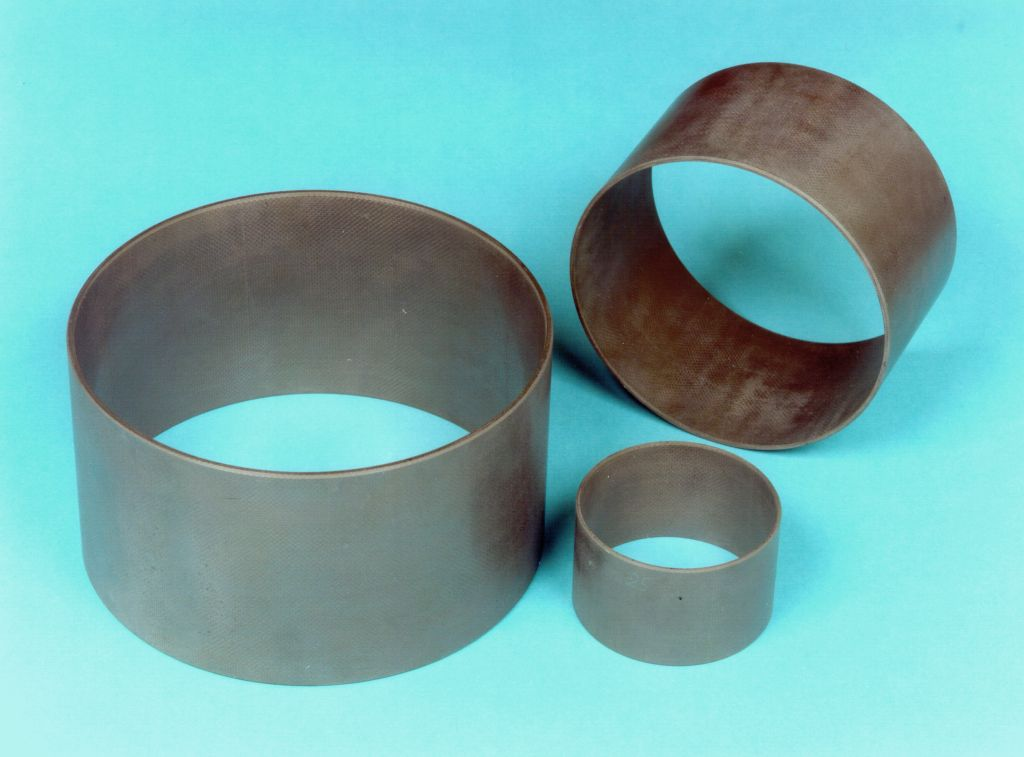
CMC shaft sleeves

In materials science ceramic matrix composites (CMCs) are a subgroup of composite materials and a subgroup of ceramics. They consist of ceramic fibers embedded in a ceramic matrix. The fibers and the matrix both can consist of any ceramic material, including carbon and carbon fibers.

== Introduction ==
The motivation to develop CMCs was to overcome the problems associated with the conventional technical ceramics like alumina, silicon carbide, aluminum nitride, silicon nitride or zirconia – they fracture easily under mechanical or thermo-mechanical loads because of cracks initiated by small defects or scratches. The crack resistance is very low, as in glass.

To increase the crack resistance or fracture toughness, particles (so-called monocrystalline whiskers or platelets) were embedded into the matrix. However, the improvement was limited, and those products found application only in some ceramic cutting tools.

The integration of long multi-strand fibers has drastically increased the crack resistance, elongation and thermal shock resistance, and resulted in several new applications. The reinforcements used in ceramic matrix composites (CMC) serve to enhance the fracture toughness of the combined material system while still taking advantage of the inherent high strength and Young's modulus of the ceramic matrix.

The most common reinforcement embodiment is a continuous-length ceramic fiber, with an elastic modulus that is typically somewhat lower than the matrix. The functional role of this fiber is (1) to increase the CMC stress for the progress of micro-cracks through the matrix, thereby increasing the energy expended during crack propagation; and then (2) when thru-thickness cracks begin to form across the CMC at higher stress (proportional limit stress, PLS), to bridge these cracks without fracturing, thereby providing the CMC with a high ultimate tensile strength (UTS). In this way, ceramic fiber reinforcements not only increase the composite structure's initial resistance to crack propagation but also allow the CMC to avoid abrupt brittle failure that is characteristic of monolithic ceramics.

This behavior is distinct from the behavior of ceramic fibers in polymer matrix composites (PMC) and metal matrix composites (MMC), where the fibers typically fracture before the matrix due to the higher failure strain capabilities of these matrices.

Carbon (C), special silicon carbide (SiC), alumina (Al_{2}O_{3}) and mullite (Al_{2}O_{3}−SiO_{2}) fibers are most commonly used for CMCs. The matrix materials are usually the same, that is C, SiC, alumina and mullite. In certain ceramic systems, including SiC and silicon nitride, processes of abnormal grain growth may result in a microstructure exhibiting elongated large grains in a matrix of finer rounded grains. AGG derived microstructures exhibit toughening due to crack bridging and crack deflection by the elongated grains, which can be considered as an in-situ produced fibre reinforcement. Recently ultra-high-temperature ceramics (UHTCs) were investigated as ceramic matrix in a new class of CMC so-called ultra-high-temperature ceramic matrix composites (UHTCMC) or ultra-high-temperature ceramic composites (UHTCC).

Generally, CMC names include a combination of type of fiber/type of matrix. For example, C/C stands for carbon-fiber-reinforced carbon (carbon/carbon), or C/SiC for carbon-fiber-reinforced silicon carbide. Sometimes the manufacturing process is included, and a C/SiC composite manufactured with the liquid polymer infiltration (LPI) process (see below) is abbreviated as LPI-C/SiC.

The important commercially available CMCs are C/C, C/SiC, SiC/SiC and Al_{2}O_{3}/Al_{2}O_{3}. They differ from conventional ceramics in the following properties, presented in more detail below:

- Elongation to rupture up to 1%
- Strongly increased fracture toughness
- Extreme thermal shock resistance
- Improved dynamical load capability
- Anisotropic properties following the orientation of fibers

== Manufacture ==
The manufacturing processes usually consist of the following three steps:

1. Lay-up and fixation of the fibers, shaped like the desired component
2. Infiltration of the matrix material
3. Final machining and, if required, further treatments like coating or impregnation of the intrinsic porosity.

The first and the last step are almost the same for all CMCs: In step one, the fibers, often named rovings, are arranged and fixed using techniques used in fiber-reinforced plastic materials, such as lay-up of fabrics, filament winding, braiding and knotting. The result of this procedure is called fiber-preform or simply preform.

For the second step, five different procedures are used to fill the ceramic matrix in between the fibers of the preform:

1. Deposition out of a gas mixture
2. Pyrolysis of a pre-ceramic polymer
3. Chemical reaction of elements
4. Sintering at a relatively low temperature in the range 1,000–1,200 °C (1,830–2,190 °F)
5. Electrophoretic deposition of a ceramic powder

Procedures one, two and three find applications with non-oxide CMCs, whereas the fourth one is used for oxide CMCs; combinations of these procedures are also practiced. The fifth procedure is not yet established in industrial processes. All procedures have sub-variations, which differ in technical details. All procedures yield a porous material.

The third and final step of machining – grinding, drilling, lapping or milling – has to be done with diamond tools. CMCs can also be processed with a water jet, laser, or ultrasonic machining.

=== Ceramic fibers ===
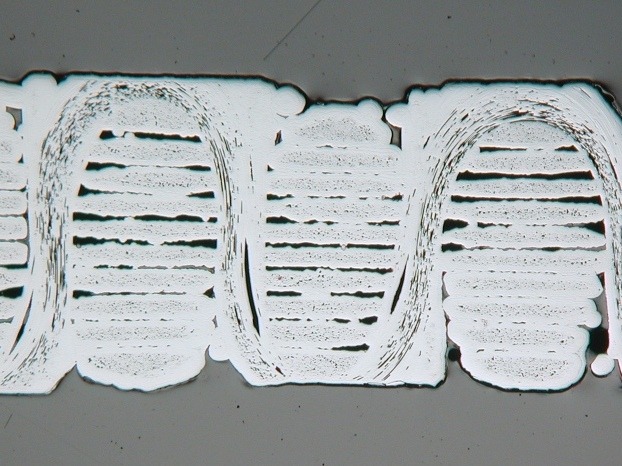
Micrograph of a SiC/SiC ceramic composite with a woven three-dimensional fiber structure

Ceramic fibers in CMCs can have a polycrystalline structure, as in conventional ceramics. They can also be amorphous or have inhomogeneous chemical composition, which develops upon pyrolysis of organic precursors. The high process temperatures required for making CMCs preclude the use of organic, metallic or glass fibers. Only fibers stable at temperatures above 1,000 °C (1,800 °F) can be used, such as fibers of alumina, mullite, SiC, zirconia or carbon. Amorphous SiC fibers have an elongation capability above 2% – much larger than in conventional ceramic materials (0.05 to 0.10%). The reason for this property of SiC fibers is that most of them contain additional elements like oxygen, titanium and/or aluminum yielding a tensile strength above 3 GPa. These enhanced elastic properties are required for various three-dimensional fiber arrangements (see example in figure) in textile fabrication, where a small bending radius is essential.

=== Manufacturing procedures ===
==== Matrix deposition from a gas phase ====
Chemical vapor deposition (CVD) is well suited for this purpose. In the presence of a fiber preform, CVD takes place in between the fibers and their individual filaments and therefore is called chemical vapor infiltration (CVI). One example is the manufacture of C/C composites: a C-fiber preform is exposed to a mixture of argon and a hydrocarbon gas (methane, propane, etc.) at a pressure of around or below 100 kPa and a temperature above 1000 °C. The gas decomposes depositing carbon on and between the fibers. Another example is the deposition of silicon carbide, which is usually conducted from a mixture of hydrogen and methyl-trichlorosilane (MTS, CH_{3}SiCl_{3}; it is also common in silicone production). Under defined condition this gas mixture deposits fine and crystalline silicon carbide on the hot surface within the preform.

This CVI procedure leaves a body with a porosity of about 10–15%, as access of reactants to the interior of the preform is increasingly blocked by deposition on the exterior.

==== Matrix forming via pyrolysis of C- and Si-containing polymers ====
Hydrocarbon polymers shrink during pyrolysis, and upon outgassing form carbon with an amorphous, glass-like structure, which by additional heat treatment can be changed to a more graphite-like structure. Other special polymers, known as preceramic polymers where some carbon atoms are replaced by silicon atoms, the so-called polycarbosilanes, yield amorphous silicon carbide of more or less stoichiometric composition. A large variety of such silicon carbide, silicon oxycarbide, silicon carbonitride and silicon oxynitride precursors already exist and more preceramic polymers for the fabrication of polymer derived ceramics are being developed. To manufacture a CMC material, the fiber preform is infiltrated with the chosen polymer. Subsequent curing and pyrolysis yield a highly porous matrix, which is undesirable for most applications. Further cycles of polymer infiltration and pyrolysis are performed until the final and desired quality is achieved. Usually, five to eight cycles are necessary.

The process is called liquid polymer infiltration (LPI), or polymer infiltration and pyrolysis (PIP). Here also a porosity of about 15% is common due to the shrinking of the polymer. The porosity is reduced after every cycle.

==== Matrix forming via chemical reaction ====
With this method, one material located between the fibers reacts with a second material to form the ceramic matrix. Some conventional ceramics are also manufactured by chemical reactions. For example, reaction-bonded silicon nitride (RBSN) is produced through the reaction of silicon powder with nitrogen, and porous carbon reacts with silicon to form reaction bonded silicon carbide, a silicon carbide which contains inclusions of a silicon phase. An example of CMC manufacture, which was introduced for the production of ceramic brake discs, is the reaction of silicon with a porous preform of C/C. The process temperature is above 1,414 °C (2,577 °F), that is above the melting point of silicon, and the process conditions are controlled such that the carbon fibers of the C/C-preform almost completely retain their mechanical properties. This process is called liquid silicon infiltration (LSI). Sometimes, and because of its starting point with C/C, the material is abbreviated as C/C-SiC. The material produced in this process has a very low porosity of about 3%.

==== Matrix forming via sintering ====
This process is used to manufacture oxide fiber/oxide matrix CMC materials. Since most ceramic fibers cannot withstand the normal sintering temperatures of above 1,600 °C (2,910 °F), special precursor liquids are used to infiltrate the preform of oxide fibers. These precursors allow sintering, that is ceramic-forming processes, at temperatures of 1000–1200 °C. They are, for example, based on mixtures of alumina powder with the liquids tetra-ethyl-orthosilicate (as Si donor) and aluminium-butylate (as Al donor), which yield a mullite matrix. Other techniques, such as sol–gel process chemistry, are also used. CMCs obtained with this process usually have a high porosity of about 20%.

==== Matrix formed via electrophoresis ====
In the electrophoretic process, electrically charged particles dispersed in a special liquid are transported through an electric field into the preform, which has the opposite electrical charge polarity. This process is under development, and is not yet used industrially. Some remaining porosity must be expected here, too.

== Properties ==
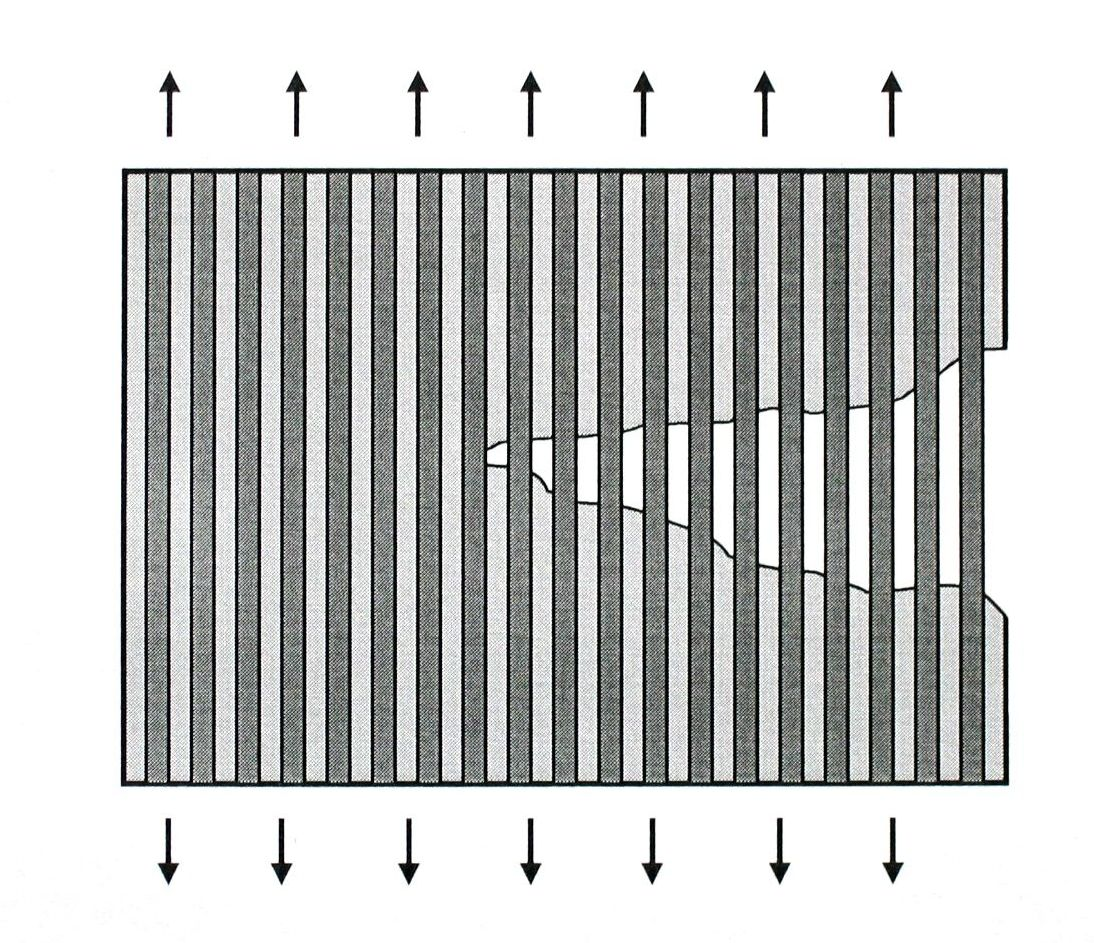
Scheme of crack bridges at the crack tip of ceramic composites

=== Mechanical properties ===
==== Basic mechanism of mechanical properties ====
The high fracture toughness or crack resistance mentioned above is a result of the following mechanism: under load the ceramic matrix cracks, like any ceramic material, at an elongation of about 0.05%. In CMCs the embedded fibers bridge these cracks (see picture). This mechanism works only when the matrix can slide along the fibers, which means that there must be a weak bond between the fibers and matrix. A strong bond would require a very high elongation capability of the fiber bridging the crack and would result in a brittle fracture, as with conventional ceramics. The production of CMC material with high crack resistance requires a step to weaken this bond between the fibers and matrix. This is achieved by depositing a thin layer of pyrolytic carbon or boron nitride on the fibers, which weakens the bond at the fiber/matrix interface, leading to the fiber pull-out at crack surfaces, as shown in the SEM picture at the top of this article. In oxide-CMCs, the high porosity of the matrix is sufficient to establish a weak bond.

==== Properties under tensile and bending loads, crack resistance ====
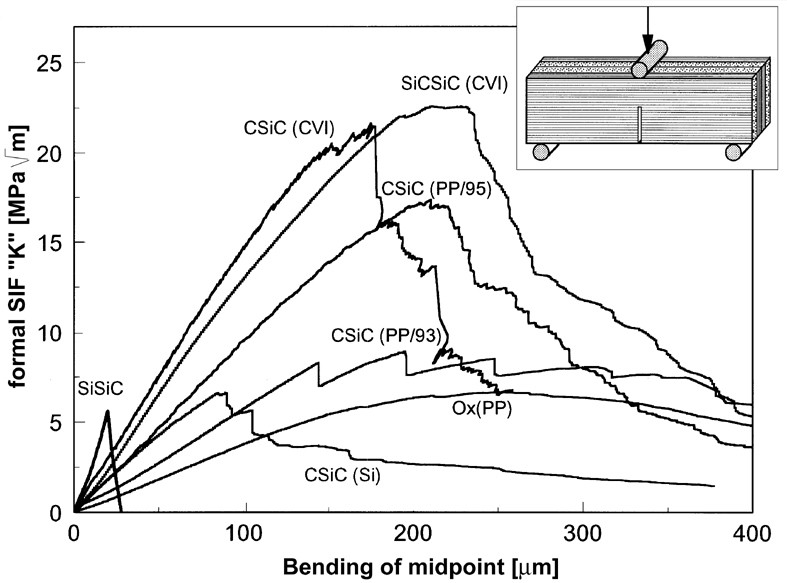
Curves of toughness measurements of various ceramic composites and SiSiC Legend: SiSiC: conventional SiSiC, SiCSiC(CVI) and CSiC(CVI): SiC/SiC and C/SiC manufactured in CVI processes, CSiC(95) und CSiC(93): C/SiC manufactured by the LPI-method, Ox(PP): oxide ceramic composite, CSiC(Si): C/SiC manufactured via the LSI process.

The influence and quality of the fiber interface can be evaluated through mechanical properties. Measurements of the crack resistance were performed with notched specimens (see figure) in so-called single-edge-notch-bend (SENB) tests. In fracture mechanics, the measured data (force, geometry and crack surface) are normalized to yield the so-called stress intensity factor (SIF), K_{Ic}. Because of the complex crack surface (see figure at the top of this article) the real crack surface area can not be determined for CMC materials. The measurements, therefore, use the initial notch as the crack surface, yielding the formal SIF shown in the figure. This requires identical geometry for comparing different samples. The area under these curves thus gives a relative indication of the energy required to drive the crack tip through the sample (force times path length gives energy). The maxima indicate the load level necessary to propagate the crack through the sample. Compared to the sample of conventional SiSiC ceramic, two observations can be made:

- All tested CMC materials need up to several orders of magnitude more energy to propagate the crack through the material.
- The force required for crack propagation varies between different types of CMCs.

Type of material	Al_{2}O_{3}/Al_{2}O_{3}	Al_{2}O_{3}	CVI-C/SiC	LPI-C/SiC	LSI-C/SiC	SiSiC
Porosity (%)	35	<1	12	12	3	<1
Density (g/cm^{3})	2.1	3.9	2.1	1.9	1.9	3.1
Tensile strength (MPa)	65	250	310	250	190	200
Elongation (%)	0.12	0.1	0.75	0.5	0.35	0.05
Young's modulus (GPa)	50	400	95	65	60	395
Flexural strength (MPa)	80	450	475	500	300	400

In the table, CVI, LPI, and LSI denote the manufacturing process of the C/SiC-material. Data on the oxide CMC and SiSiC are taken from manufacturer datasheets. The tensile strength of SiSiC and Al_{2}O_{3} were calculated from measurements of elongation to fracture and Young's modulus, since generally only bending strength data are available for those ceramics. Averaged values are given in the table, and significant differences, even within one manufacturing route, are possible.

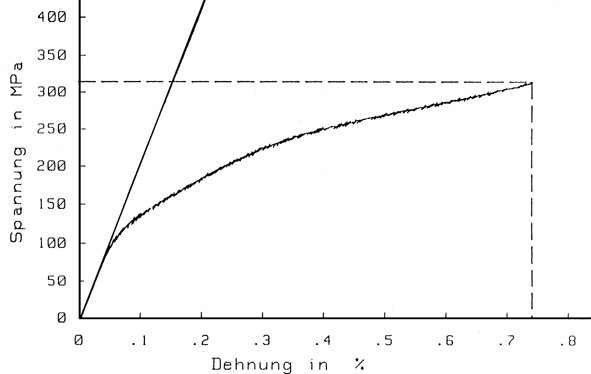
Stress-strain curve of a tensile test for CVI-SiC/SiC

Tensile tests of CMCs usually show nonlinear stress-strain curves, which look as if the material deforms plastically. It is called quasi-plastic, because the effect is caused by the microcracks, which are formed and bridged with increasing load. Since the Young's modulus of the load-carrying fibers is generally lower than that of the matrix, the slope of the curve decreases with increasing load.

Curves from bending tests look similar to those of the crack resistance measurements shown above.

The following features are essential in evaluating bending and tensile data of CMCs:

- CMC materials with a low matrix content (down to zero) have a high tensile strength (close to the tensile strength of the fiber), but low bending strength.
- CMC materials with a low fiber content (down to zero) have a high bending strength (close to the strength of the monolithic ceramic), but no elongation beyond 0.05% under tensile load.

The primary quality criterion for CMCs is crack resistance behavior or fracture toughness.

===== High Temperature Creep Properties =====
Although CMCs are able to operate at very high temperatures, creep deformation still occur around 1000 °C, in the range of certain high-temperature applications. Creep acts on either the matrix or fiber depending on the creep mismatch ratio (CMR) between the effective fiber strain rate and effective matrix strain rate. The component with the smaller strain rate bears the load and is susceptible to creep.

The three main creep stages are governed by the creep mismatch ratio. During primary creep, internal stresses are transferred allowing the CMR to approach unity, as well as the secondary creep stage. The tertiary creep stage, where failure occurs, can be governed by fiber creep, where failure occurs due to fiber fracture, or matrix creep, which lead to matrix cracking. Usually, matrix creep strength is worse than the fiber, so the fiber bears the load. However, matrix cracking can still occur with weak fiber regions, resulting in oxidation in oxidizing atmospheres, weakening the material. Increasing temperature, applied stress, and defect densities lead to greater creep deformation and earlier failure.

A rule of mixtures may be applied to find the strain rate of the composite given the strain rates of the constituents. For particulates, a simple sum of the product of the cross-sectional area fraction and creep response of each constituent can determine the composite's total creep response. For fibers, a sum of the constituents’ creep response divided by the cross-sectional area fraction determines the total creep response.

Particulates: $\epsilon_{cr}=\sum_{i=1}M_i\epsilon_{cr,i}$

Fibers: $\epsilon_{cr}=(\sum_{i=1}\frac{M_i}{\epsilon_{cr,i}})^{-1}$

where $\epsilon_{cr}$ is the creep response and $M_i$ is the constituent cross sectional area fraction.

==== Other mechanical properties ====
In many CMC components the fibers are arranged as 2-dimensional (2D) stacked plain or satin weave fabrics. Thus the resulting material is anisotropic or, more specifically, orthotropic. A crack between the layers is not bridged by fibers. Therefore, the interlaminar shear strength (ILS) and the strength perpendicular to the 2D fiber orientation are low for these materials. Delamination can occur easily under certain mechanical loads. Three-dimensional fiber structures can improve this situation (see micrograph above).

Material	CVI-C/SiC	LPI-C/SiC	LSI-C/SiC	CVI-SiC/SiC
Interlaminar shear strength (MPa)	45	30	33	50
Tensile strength vertical to fabric plane (MPa)	6	4	–	7
Compressive strength vertical to fabric plane (MPa)	500	450	–	500

The compressive strengths shown in the table are lower than those of conventional ceramics, where values above 2000 MPa are common; this is a result of porosity.

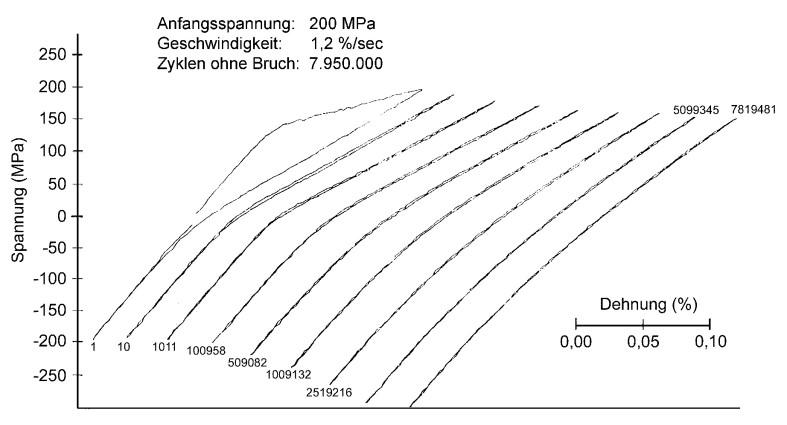
Strain controlled LCF-test for a CVI-SiC/SiC-specimen

The composite structure allows high dynamical loads. In the so-called low-cycle-fatigue (LCF) or high-cycle-fatigue (HCF) tests the material experiences cyclic loads under tensile and compressive (LCF) or only tensile (HCF) load. The higher the initial stress the shorter the lifetime and the smaller the number of cycles to rupture. With an initial load of 80% of the strength, a SiC/SiC sample survived about 8 million cycles (see figure).

The Poisson's ratio shows an anomaly when measured perpendicular to the plane of the fabric because interlaminar cracks increase the sample thickness.

=== Thermal and electrical properties ===
The thermal and electrical properties of the composite are a result of its constituents, namely fibers, matrix, and pores as well as their composition. The orientation of the fibers yields anisotropic data. Oxide CMCs are very good electrical insulators, and because of their high porosity, their thermal insulation is much better than that of conventional oxide ceramics.

The use of carbon fibers increases the electrical conductivity, provided the fibers contact each other and the voltage source. The silicon carbide matrix is a good thermal conductor. Electrically, it is a semiconductor, and its resistance therefore decreases with increasing temperature. Compared to (poly)crystalline SiC, the amorphous SiC fibers are relatively poor conductors of heat and electricity.

Material	CVI-C/SiC	LPI-C/SiC	LSI-C/SiC	CVI-SiC/SiC	SiSiC
Thermal conductivity (p) [W/(m·K)]	15	11	21	18	>100
Thermal conductivity (v) [W/(m·K)]	7	5	15	10	>100
Linear expansion (p) [10^{−6}·1/K]	1.3	1.2	0	2.3	4
Linear expansion (v) [10^{−6}·1/K]	3	4	3	3	4
Electrical resistivity (p) [Ω·cm]	–	–	–	–	50
Electrical resistivity (v) [Ω·cm]	0.4	–	–	5	50

Comments for the table: (p) and (v) refer to data parallel and vertical to fiber orientation of the 2D-fiber structure, respectively. LSI material has the highest thermal conductivity because of its low porosity – an advantage when using it for brake discs. These data are subject to scatter depending on details of the manufacturing processes.

Conventional ceramics are very sensitive to thermal stress because of their high Young's modulus and low elongation capability. Temperature differences and low thermal conductivity create locally different elongations, which together with the high Young's modulus generate high stress. This results in cracks, rupture, and brittle failure. In CMCs, the fibers bridge the cracks, and the components show no macroscopic damage, even if the matrix has cracked locally. The application of CMCs in brake disks demonstrates the effectiveness of ceramic composite materials under extreme thermal shock conditions.

=== Corrosion properties ===
Data on the corrosion behaviour of CMCs are scarce except for oxidation at temperatures above 1000 °C. These properties are determined by the constituents, namely the fibers and matrix. Ceramic materials, in general, are very stable to corrosion. The broad spectrum of manufacturing techniques with different sintering additives, mixtures, glass phases, and porosities are crucial for the results of corrosion tests. Less impurities and exact stoichiometry lead to less corrosion. Amorphous structures and non-ceramic chemicals frequently used as sintering aids are starting points of corrosive attack.

Alumina

Pure alumina shows excellent corrosion resistance against most chemicals. Amorphous glass and silica phases at the grain boundaries determine the speed of corrosion in concentrated acids and bases and result in creep at high temperatures. These characteristics limit the use of alumina. For molten metals, alumina is used only with gold and platinum.

Alumina fibers

These fibers demonstrate corrosion properties similar to alumina, but commercially available fibers are not very pure and therefore less resistant. Because of creep at temperatures above 1000 °C, there are only a few applications for oxide CMCs.

Carbon

The most significant corrosion of carbon occurs in the presence of oxygen above about 500 °C (932 °F). It burns to form carbon dioxide and/or carbon monoxide. It also oxidizes in strong oxidizing agents like concentrated nitric acid. In molten metals, it dissolves and forms metal carbides. Carbon fibers do not differ from carbon in their corrosion behavior.

Silicon carbide

Pure silicon carbide is one of the most corrosion-resistant materials. Only strong bases, oxygen above about 800 °C (1,470 °F), and molten metals react with it to form carbides and silicides. The reaction with oxygen forms SiO_{2} and CO_{2}, whereby a surface layer of SiO_{2} slows down subsequent oxidation (passive oxidation). Temperatures above about 1,600 °C (2,910 °F) and a low partial pressure of oxygen result in so-called active oxidation, in which CO, CO_{2} and gaseous SiO are formed causing rapid loss of SiC. If the SiC matrix is produced other than by CVI, corrosion-resistance is not as good. This is a consequence of porosity in the amorphous LPI, and residual silicon in the LSI-matrix.

Silicon carbide fibers

Silicon carbide fibers are produced via pyrolysis of organic polymers, and therefore their corrosion properties are similar to those of the silicon carbide found in LPI-matrices. These fibers are thus more sensitive to bases and oxidizing media than pure silicon carbide.

== Applications ==
CMC materials overcome the major disadvantages of conventional technical ceramics, namely brittle failure and low fracture toughness, and limited thermal shock resistance. Therefore, their applications are in fields requiring reliability at high-temperatures (beyond the capability of metals) and resistance to corrosion and wear. These include:

- Heat shield systems for space vehicles, which are needed during the re-entry phase, where high temperatures, thermal shock conditions and heavy vibration loads take place.
- Components for high-temperature gas turbines such as combustion chambers, stator vanes, exhaust mixers and turbine blades.
- Components for burners, flame holders, and hot gas ducts, where the use of oxide CMCs has found its way.
- Brake disks and brake system components, which experience extreme thermal shock (greater than throwing a glowing part of any material into water).
- Components for slide bearings under heavy loads requiring high corrosion and wear resistance.

In addition to the foregoing, CMCs can be used in applications which employ conventional ceramics or in which metal components have limited lifetimes due to corrosion or high temperatures.

=== Developments for applications in space ===
During the re-entry phase of space vehicles, the heat shield system is exposed to temperatures above 1,500 °C (2,730 °F) for a few minutes. Only ceramic materials can survive such conditions without significant damage, and among ceramics, only CMCs can adequately handle thermal shocks. The development of CMC-based heat shield systems promises the following advantages:

- Reduced weight
- Higher load-carrying capacity of the system
- Reusability for several re-entries
- Better steering during the re-entry phase with CMC flap systems

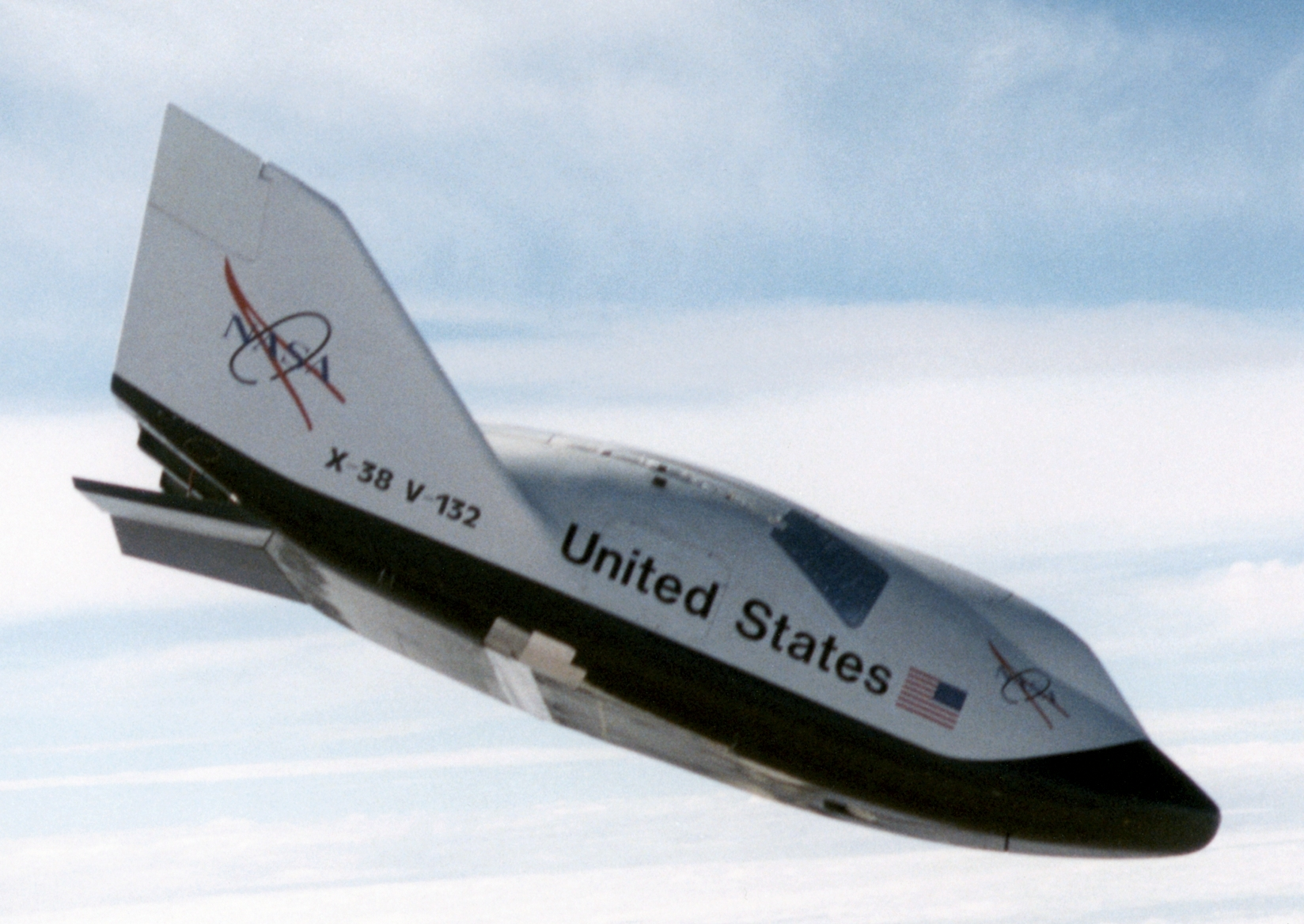
NASA-space vehicle X-38 during a test flight

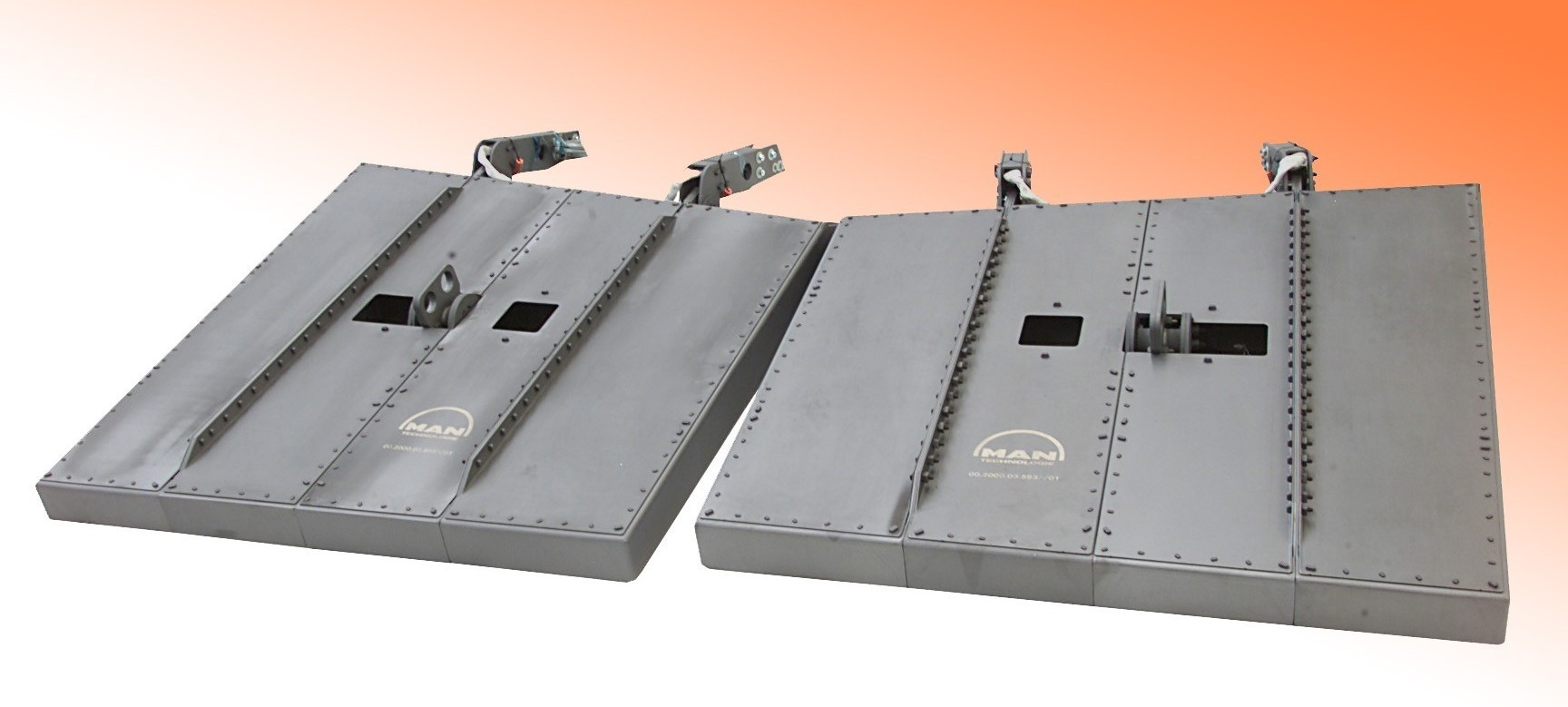
Pair of steering flaps for the NASA X-38. Size: 1.5×1.5×0.15 m; mass: 68 kg each; various components are mounted using more than 400 CVI-C/SiC screws and nuts.

In these applications, the high temperatures preclude the use of oxide fiber CMCs, because under the expected loads the creep would be too high. Amorphous silicon carbide fibers lose their strength due to re-crystallization at temperatures above 1,250 °C (2,280 °F). Therefore, carbon fibers in a silicon carbide matrix (C/SiC) are used in development programs for these applications. The European program HERMES of ESA, started in the 1980s and for financial reasons abandoned in 1992, has produced first results. Several follow-up programs focused on the development, manufacture, and qualification of nose cap, leading edges and steering flaps for the NASA X-38 space vehicle.

This development program has qualified the use of C/SiC bolts and nuts and the bearing system of the flaps. The latter were ground-tested at the DLR in Stuttgart, Germany, under expected conditions of the re-entry phase: 1,600 °C (2,910 °F), 4 tonnes load, oxygen partial pressure similar to re-entry conditions, and simultaneous bearing movements of four cycles per second. A total of five re-entry phases were simulated. Design and manufacture of the two steering flaps and its bearings, screws and nuts was performed by MT Aerospace in Augsburg, Germany based on the CVI-process for the production of carbon fiber reinforced silicon carbide (see manufacturing procedures above). Furthermore, oxidation protection systems were developed and qualified to prevent burnout of the carbon fibers. After mounting of the flaps, mechanical ground tests were performed successfully by NASA in Houston, Texas, US. The next test – a real re-entry of the unmanned vehicle X-38 – was canceled for financial reasons. One of the Space Shuttles would have brought the vehicle into orbit, from where it would have returned to the Earth.

These qualifications were promising for only this application. The high-temperature load lasts only around 20 minutes per re-entry, and for reusability, only about 30 cycles would be sufficient. For industrial applications in a hot gas environment, though, several hundred cycles of thermal loads and up to many thousands of hours of lifetime are required.

The Intermediate eXperimental Vehicle (IXV), a project initiated by ESA in 2009, is Europe's first lifting body reentry vehicle. Developed by Thales Alenia Space, the IXV was scheduled to make its first flight in 2014 on the fourth Vega mission (VV04) over the Gulf of Guinea. More than 40 European companies contributed to its construction. The thermal protection system for the underside of the vehicle, comprising the nose, leading edges and lower surface of the wing, were designed and made by Herakles using a ceramic matrix composite (CMC), carbon/silicon-carbide (C/SiC), in this case based on the liquid silicon infiltration (LSI) process (see manufacturing procedures above). These components should have been functioned as the vehicle's heat shield during its atmospheric reentry.

The European Commission funded a research project, C3HARME, under the NMP-19-2015 call of Framework Programmes for Research and Technological Development (H2020) in 2016 for the design, development, production, and testing of a new class of ultra-high-temperature ceramic matrix composites (UHTCMC) reinforced with silicon carbide fibers and carbon fibers suitable for applications in severe aerospace environments such as propulsion and Thermal protection systems (TPSs).

=== Developments for gas turbine components ===
The use of CMCs in gas turbines permit higher turbine inlet temperatures, which improves engine efficiency. Because of the complex shape of stator vanes and turbine blades, the development was first focused on the combustion chamber. In the US, a combustor made of SiC/SiC with a special SiC fiber of enhanced high-temperature stability was successfully tested for 15,000 hours. SiC oxidation was substantially reduced by the use of an oxidation protection coating consisting of several layers of oxides.

The engine collaboration between General Electric and Rolls-Royce studied the use of CMC stator vanes in the hot section of the F136, a turbofan engine which failed to beat the Pratt & Whitney F135 for use in the F-35 Joint Strike Fighter. An engine joint venture, CFM International, is using CMCs to manufacture the high-temperature turbine shrouds. General Electric is using CMCs in combustor liners, nozzles, and the high-temperature turbine shroud for its upcoming GE9X engine. CMC parts are also being studied for stationary applications in both the cold and hot sections of the engines since stresses imposed on rotating parts would require further development effort. Generally, development continues of CMCs for use in turbines to reduce technical issues and cost reduction.

After US$1.5 billion in investment and 20 years of research and development, by 2020 GE Aviation aims to produce per year up to 20 t (44,000 lb) of CMC prepreg and 10 t of silicon carbide fiber. Chemical vapor deposition can apply coatings on a laid-able fiber tape in large quantities and GE managed to infiltrate and cast parts with very high silicon densities, higher than 90% for cyclic fatigue environments, thanks to thermal processing.

==== EBCs to protect gas turbine components ====
Environmental barrier coatings (EBCs) provide a barrier to the CMCs to reduce the amount of oxygen and other corrosive substances from diffusing through the surface of CMC components.

Design Requirements for EBCs:

- Relative coefficient match with CMC component to reduce probability of cracking
- Low volatility to minimize stead-induced corrosion/recession
- Resistant to molten ingested particulate
- High temperature capability
- Phase stability at high temperatures
- Chemical Compatibility with the CMC and additional layers
- High Hardness and toughness to protect against Foreign Object Damage (FOD) and erosion

Typically when coating with an EBC a bond coat is required to support good adhesion to the CMC component. NASA has developed a slurry based EBC which starts with a mullite-based coating before being layered with an additional 2-3 layers. In order for EBCs to actively protect the CMC surface, sintering aids must be added to the slurry coat to create a dense coating that will block the penetration of oxygen, gaseous, and molten deposits from the engine. Sintering creates a densified coating and enhances bonding and performance of the coating.

Currently, research is being done to combat common failure modes such as delamination, erosion, and cracking caused by steam or molten deposits. Delamination and cracking due to molten deposits are typically caused by the reaction with the EBC creating an unexpected microstructure leading to CTE mismatch and low toughness in that phase. Steam degradation is caused by the volatilization of the thermally grown oxide layer between the EBC and the ceramic. The steam produced from this leads to a rapid recession of SiC, i.e. degradation of the EBC. The success of EBCs are imperative to the overall success of CMC components in the gas flow of the turbine in jet engines.

Overall benefits of EBCs:

- Extends the life of CMC components allowing for overall cost savings in jet engine production
- Improves Oxidation Resistance of CMC components
- Provides greater oxidation resistance to CMC components exposed to gaseous compounds from the jet engine

=== Application of oxide CMC in burner and hot gas ducts ===
Oxygen-containing gas at temperatures above 1,000 °C (1,800 °F) is rather corrosive for metal and silicon carbide components. Such components, which are not exposed to high mechanical stress, can be made of oxide CMCs, which can withstand temperatures up to 1,200 °C (2,190 °F). The gallery below shows the flame holder of a crispbread bakery as tested after for 15,000 hours, which subsequently operated for a total of more than 20,000 hours.

Oxide CMC flame holder	Ventilator for hot gases	Lifting gate, oxide CMC	Lifting gate in the field

Flaps and ventilators circulating hot, oxygen-containing gases can be fabricated in the same shape as their metal equivalents. The lifetime for these oxide CMC components is several times longer than for metals, which often deform. A further example is an oxide CMC lifting gate for a sintering furnace, which has survived more than 260,000 opening cycles.

=== Application in brake discs ===
Carbon/carbon (C/C) materials are used in the disc brakes of racing cars and airplanes, and C/SiC brake disks manufactured by the LSI process were qualified and are commercially available for sports cars. The advantages of these C/SiC disks are:

- Very little wear, resulting in lifetime use for a car with a normal driving load of 300,000 km (190,000 mi), is forecast by manufacturers.
- No fading is experienced, even under high load.
- No surface humidity effect on the friction coefficient shows up, as in C/C brake disks.
- The corrosion resistance, for example to the road salt, is much better than for metal disks.
- The disk mass is only 40% of a metal disk. This translates into less unsprung and rotating mass.

The weight reduction improves shock absorber response, road-holding comfort, agility, fuel economy, and thus driving comfort.

The SiC-matrix of LSI has a very low porosity, which protects the carbon fibers quite well. Brake disks do not experience temperatures above 500 °C (932 °F) for more than a few hours in their lifetime. Oxidation is therefore not a problem in this application. The reduction of manufacturing costs will decide the success of this application for middle-class cars.

=== Application in slide bearings ===
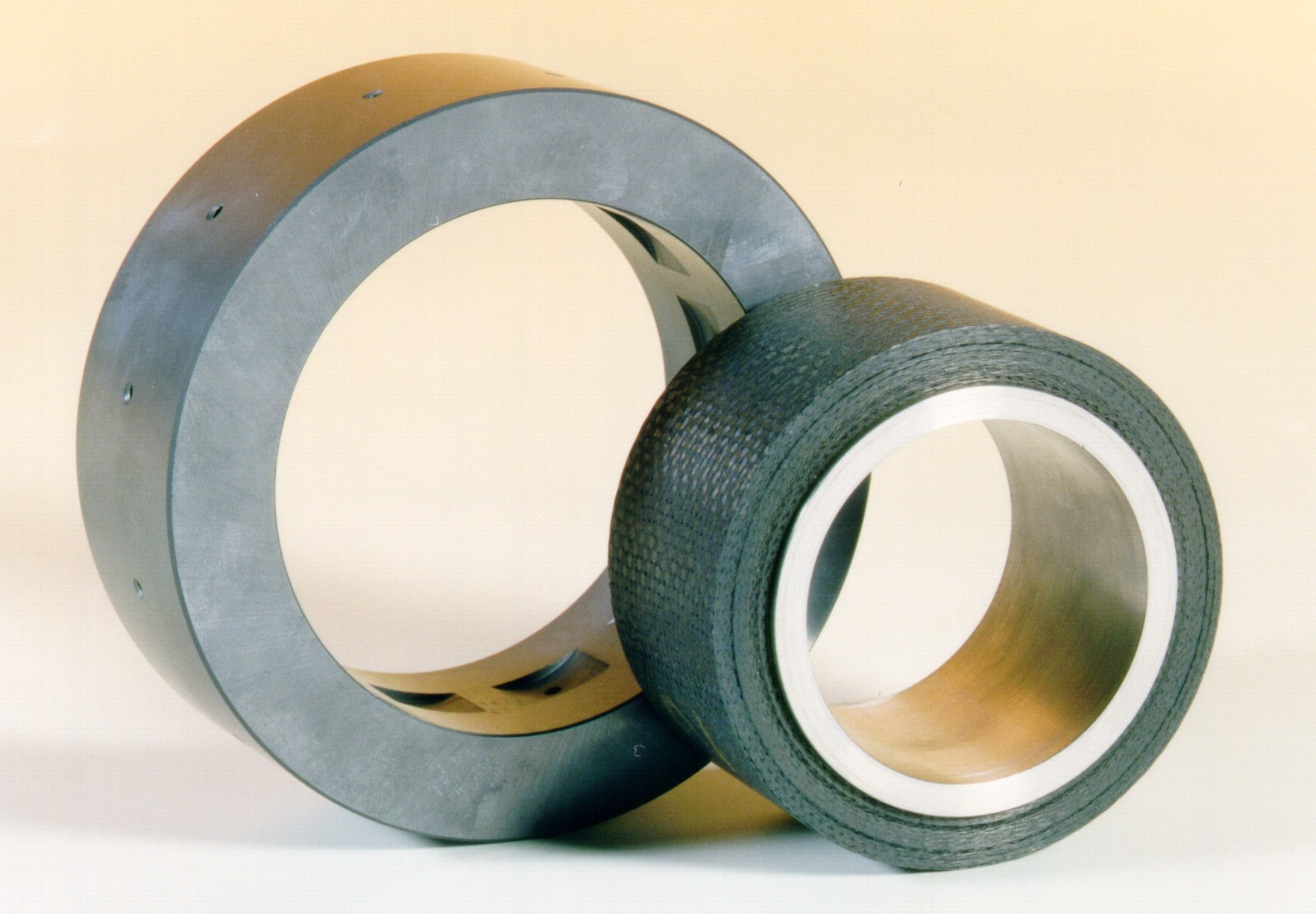
Components for a ceramic slide bearing; the picture shows a sintered SiC-bearing for a hydrostatic slide bearing and a CVI-SiC/SiC-shaft sleeve shrink-fitted on metal, a system tested with liquid oxygen as lubricant.

Conventional SiC, or sometimes the less expensive SiSiC, have been used successfully for more than 25 years in slide or journal bearings of pumps. The pumped liquid itself provides the lubricant for the bearing. Very good corrosion resistance against practically all kinds of media, and very low wear and low friction coefficients are the basis of this success. These bearings consist of a static bearing, shrink-fitted in its metallic environment, and a rotating shaft sleeve, mounted on the shaft. Under compressive stress, the ceramic static bearing has a low risk of failure, but a SiC shaft sleeve does not have this situation and must, therefore, have a large wall thickness and/or be specially designed. In large pumps with shafts 100–350 mm (3.9–13.8 in) in diameter, the risk of failure is higher due to the changing requirements on the pump performance – for example, load changes during operation. The introduction of SiC/SiC as a shaft sleeve material has proven to be very successful. Test rig experiments showed an almost triple specific load capability of the bearing system with a shaft sleeve made of SiC/SiC, sintered SiC as static bearing, and water at 80 °C (176 °F) as lubricant. The specific load capacity of a bearing is usually given in W/mm^{2} and calculated as a product of the load (MPa), the surface speed of the bearing (m/s) and friction coefficient; it is equal to the power loss of the bearing system due to friction.

This slide bearing concept, namely SiC/SiC shaft sleeve and SiC bearing, has been used since 1994 in applications such as in the boiler feedwater pumps of power stations, which pump several thousand cubic meters of hot water to a level of 2,000 m (6,600 ft), and in tubular casing pumps for water works or seawater desalination plants, pumping up to 40,000 m^{3} (1,400,000 cu ft) to a level of around 20 m (66 ft).

This bearing system has been tested in pumps for liquid oxygen, for example in oxygen turbopumps for thrust engines of space rockets, with the following results. SiC and SiC/SiC are compatible with liquid oxygen. In an auto-ignition test according to the French standard NF 28-763, no auto-ignition was observed with powdered SiC/SiC in 20 bar pure oxygen at temperatures up to 525 °C (977 °F). Tests have shown that the friction coefficient is half, and wear one-fiftieth of standard metals used in this environment. A hydrostatic bearing system (see picture) has survived several hours at a speed up to 10,000 revolutions per minute, various loads, and 50 cycles of start/stop transients without any significant traces of wear.

=== Other applications and developments ===
- Thrust control flaps for military jet engines
- Components for fusion and fission reactors
- Friction systems for various applications
- Nuclear applications
- Solar furnaces
- Heat treatment, high temperature, soldering fixtures

== See also ==
- Polymer matrix composites
- Metal matrix composites
