= OTMS =

OTMS may refer to:

- Otto Marseus van Schrieck's monogram
- Octadecyltrimethoxysilane
- Over Thirty Months Scheme a scheme to keep older cattle out of the human food chain
