= Ultra-high temperature ceramic matrix composite =

Ultra-high temperature ceramic matrix composites (UHTCMC) are a class of refractory ceramic matrix composites (CMCs) with melting points significantly higher than that of typical CMCs. Among other applications, they are the subject of extensive research in the aerospace engineering field for their ability to withstand extreme heat for extended periods of time, a crucial property in applications such as thermal protection systems (TPS) for high heat fluxes (> 10 MW/m2) and rocket nozzles. Carbon fiber-reinforced carbon (C/C) maintains its structural integrity up to 2000 °C; however, C/C is mainly used as an ablative material, designed to purposefully erode under extreme temperatures in order to dissipate energy. Carbon fiber reinforced silicon carbide matrix composites (C/SiC) and Silicon carbide fiber reinforced silicon carbide matrix composites (SiC/SiC) are considered reusable materials because silicon carbide is a hard material with a low erosion and it forms a silica glass layer during oxidation which prevents further oxidation of inner material. However, above a certain temperature (which depends on the environmental conditions, such as the partial pressure of oxygen), the active oxidation of the silicon carbide matrix begins, resulting in the formation of gaseous silicon monoxide (SiO(g)). This leads to a loss of protection against further oxidation, causing the material to undergo uncontrolled and rapid erosion. For this reason C/SiC and SiC/SiC are used in the range of temperature between 1200 °C - 1400 °C. The oxidation resistance and the thermo-mechanical properties of these materials can be improved by incorporating a fraction of about 20-30% of UHTC phases, e.g., ZrB_{2}, into the matrix.

On the one hand CMCs are lightweight materials with high strength-to-weight ratio even at high temperature, high thermal shock resistance and toughness but suffer of erosion during service. On the other side bulk ceramics made of ultra-high-temperature ceramics (e.g. ZrB_{2}, HfB_{2}, or their composites) are hard materials which show low erosion even above 2000 °C but are heavy and suffer of catastrophic fracture and low thermal shock resistance compared to CMCs. Failure is easily under mechanical or thermo-mechanical loads because of cracks initiated by small defects or scratches. current research is focused on combining several reinforcing elements (e.g short carbon fibers, PAN or pitch based continuous carbon fibers, ceramic fibers, graphite sheets, etc) with UHTC phases to reduce the brittleness of these materials.

The European Commission funded a research project, C^{3}HARME, under the NMP-19-2015 call of Framework Programmes for Research and Technological Development in 2016-2020 for the design, manufacturing and testing of a new class of ultra-refractory ceramic matrix composites reinforced with carbon fibers suitable for applications in severe aerospace environments as possible near-zero ablation thermal protection system (TPS) materials (e.g. heat shield) and for propulsion (e.g. rocket nozzle). The demand for reusable advanced materials with temperature capability over 2000 °C has been growing. Recently carbon fiber reinforced zirconium boride-based composites obtained by powder slurry impregnation (SI) and sintering has been investigated. With these promising properties, these materials can be also considered for other applications including as friction materials for braking systems.

== Breakthroughs in research ==
The European Commission funded a research project, C^{3}HARME, under the NMP-19-2015 call of Framework Programmes for Research and Technological Development in 2016-2020 for the design, manufacturing and testing of a new class of ultra-refractory ceramic matrix composites reinforced with silicon carbide fibers and Carbon fibers suitable for applications in severe aerospace environments.

== Challenges in manufacturing and machining ==
The manufacturing and machining of UHTCMCs present new challenges due to the unique properties of these advanced materials. Traditional manufacturing techniques such as casting and molding may not be suitable for UHTCMCs, requiring the development of specific methods like chemical vapor infiltration (CVI), polymer infiltration and pyrolysis (PIP), reactive melt infiltration (RMI), slurry impregnation and sintering (SIS) or by combining multiple processes in sequence. CVI involves the infiltration of a porous preform, typically made of fibers, with a gas-phase precursor that decomposes at high temperatures to form a ceramic matrix. The process begins by placing the fiber preform in a reaction chamber, where it is exposed to a gaseous precursor, such as silicon-containing compounds (e.g., CH_{4}, SiCl_{4} or SiH_{4}) in the presence of heat. At elevated temperatures, the precursor gases react and deposit a solid ceramic material onto the fibers, forming a dense matrix.

The process also ensures and adequate bonding between the matrix and the reinforcing fibers, enhancing the mechanical properties and thermal stability of the composite. However, CVI is relatively slow due to the need for long infiltration times. The method is also sensitive to process conditions, requiring careful control of temperature, pressure, and precursor concentration to avoid defects like porosity or incomplete infiltration.

PIP involves multiple cycles polymer infiltration followed by pyrolysis, leading to high material performance but is time-consuming and costly due to the need for several infiltration and pyrolysis steps. RMI is faster, as molten metal or ceramic infiltrates the preform, forming a strong composite. However, it requires precise control of the high-temperature process and can be expensive depending on the materials used. SIS is the fastest process ensuring also the largest fraction of UHTC phases in the matrix, but it may face issues with uniformity, bonding between fibers and the matrix. Moreover, sintering occurs via hot pressing (HP) or spark plasma sintering (SPS) furnaces which required mechanical pressure to produce a low porosity material, so the process allow to produce simple shape and scalability could be an issue.In addition, the consolidation of these materials is done combining a strong mechanical pressing during the sintering process at very high temperature. These furnaces allow simple shapes to be produced, and currently the largest furnaces to date on the market allow side plate sizes around half a meter. Scalability of the process is therefore limited by the ability of these special furnaces with mechanical pressing to exert and control high forces over large areas uniformly at very high temperature (usually graphite pistons and molds).

The choice of process depends on the desired material properties, cost constraints, and production scale. A comparison of mechanical properties and ablation resistance of similar UHTCMC materials obtained by different technologies is reported in ref

Machining these materials is particularly challenging due to their high hardness and low fracture toughness (comparared to metals), which demand advanced tools and techniques to avoid cracking or delamination. Additionally, the anisotropic nature of fiber reinforced materials, arising from the directional arrangement of fibers, adds complexity to achieving precise shapes and finishes. Furthermore, maintaining the integrity of the fiber-matrix interface during processing is critical to preserving the material's mechanical properties. As a result, ongoing research is focused on optimizing manufacturing processes, improving tool materials, and developing novel machining strategies to meet the increasing demand for CMCs and UHTCMCs in industries such as aerospace, automotive, radioisotope formation and renewable energies. Their compatibility with cells was studied for possible application in biomedical fields.
