= Ammonium hexafluorozirconate =

Names
- Other names Diammonium hexafluorozirconate(2-), diammonium hexafluorozirconate, bis(ammonium) hexafluorozirconate(2-)

Identifiers
CAS Number	16919-31-6
3D model (JSmol)	Interactive image
ChemSpider	11221763
ECHA InfoCard	100.037.231
EC Number	240-970-4
PubChem CID	46173004
CompTox Dashboard (EPA)	DTXSID40937604
- InChI: InChI=1S/6FH.2H3N.Zr/ h6*1H;2*1H3;/q;;;;;;;;+4/p-4 Key: LPFRXGDQGULMEN-UHFFFAOYSA-J
- SMILES: [NH4+].[NH4+].F[Zr-2](F)(F)(F)(F)F

Properties
Chemical formula	F_{6}H_{8}N_{2}Zr
Molar mass	241.292 g·mol^{−1}
Appearance	White Powder
Density	1.15 g/cm^{3}

Structure
Crystal structure	orthorhombic
Space group	Pca2_{1}
Lattice constant	a = 13.398 Å, b = 7.739 Å, c = 11.680 Å
Lattice volume (V)	1211.1 Å^{3}
Formula units (Z)	8 units per cell

Hazards
- GHS labelling
Pictograms	(GHS05: Corrosive) (GHS06: Toxic) (GHS07: Exclamation mark) (GHS09: Environmental hazard)
Signal word	Danger
Hazard statements	H301, H311, H314, H315, H317, H319, H331, H335, H372, H412
Precautionary statements	P260, P262, P264, P264+P265, P270, P271, P272, P273, P280, P301+P316, P301+P330+P331, P302+P352, P302+P361+P354, P304+P340, P305+P351+P338, P305+P354+P338, P316, P317, P319, P321, P330, P333+P317, P337+P317, P361+P364, P362+P364, P363, P403+P233, P405, P501

Related compounds
Other cations	Lithium hexafluorozirconate; Sodium hexafluorozirconate; Potassium hexafluorozirconate
Related compounds	Hexafluorozirconic acid
- Except where otherwise noted, data are given for materials in their standard state (at 25 °C [77 °F], 100 kPa). Infobox references

Ammonium hexafluorozirconate is a complex inorganic compound of nitrogen, hydrogen, fluorine, and zirconium with the chemical formula (NH_{4})_{2}ZrF_{6}. It is the ammonium salt of hexafluorozirconic acid.

== Preparation ==
Ammonium hexafluorozirconate can be prepared by adding ammonium fluoride solution to zirconium oxide solution in hydrofluoric acid.

== Uses ==
Ammonium hexafluorozirconate is used in anti-corrosion treatment of metals; it forms ultrafine metal powder by thermal decomposition. It is also used as an additive in dental impression materials.

Ammonium hexafluorozirconate is of research interest for the treatment of silica substrates used in the activation of metallocene catalysts. The hexafluorozirconate anion is suitable because it contains a Lewis acidic metal.

== Related compounds ==
Several mixed ammonium hexafluorozirconates with alkali metal cations isomorphously replacing ammonium have been characterized.

An ammonium heptafluorozirconate ((NH_{4})_{3}ZrF_{7}) has also been characterized.
