= Lithium hexafluorozirconate =

Names
- Other names: Dilithium hexafluorozirconate; Zirconium lithium hexafluoride; Lithium hexafluorozirconate(IV)

Identifiers
CAS Number	17275-59-1
3D model (JSmol)	Interactive image
ChemSpider	11511336
EC Number	241-307-1
PubChem CID	22639498
- InChI: InChI=1S/6FH.2Li.Zr/h6*1H;;;/q;;;;;;2*+1;+4/p-6 Key: WZTMZLBJVVIBSA-UHFFFAOYSA-H
- SMILES: [Zr+4]([F-])([F-])([F-])([F-])([F-])[F-].[Li+]

Properties
Chemical formula	F_{6}Li_{2}Zr
Molar mass	219.09 g·mol^{−1}

Structure
Crystal structure	hexagonal
Space group	P3̅1m
Lattice constant	a = 4.9733 Å, c = 4.658 Å
Formula units (Z)	1 unit per cell

Related compounds
Other cations	Ammonium hexafluorozirconate; Sodium hexafluorozirconate; Potassium hexafluorozirconate
Related compounds	Hexafluorozirconic acid
- Except where otherwise noted, data are given for materials in their standard state (at 25 °C [77 °F], 100 kPa). Infobox references

Lithium hexafluorozirconate is an inorganic compound of lithium, fluorine, and zirconium with the chemical formula Li_{2}ZrF_{6}. It is the lithium salt of hexafluorozirconic acid.

== Structure ==
Lithium hexafluorozirconate forms tetragonal crystals under standard conditions; a monoclinic phase has been observed under high pressure.

== Preparation ==
Lithium hexafluorozirconate can be prepared by treating lithium fluoride with hexafluorozirconic acid solution.

== Uses ==
Lithium hexafluorozirconate is of research interest as an electrolyte in lithium metal batteries. The in situ formation of a trigonal Li_{2}ZrF_{6} solid–electrolyte interphase was reported to enhance Li-ion transfer and suppress the growth of Li dendrites.

== Related compounds ==
Tetralithium octafluoridozirconate (Li_{4}ZrF_{8}) has been characterized. It is prepared by hydrothermal synthesis.

A hexafluorozirconate composed of lithium and magnesium cations (Li_{2}Mg(ZrF_{6})_{2}) has also been characterized along with the tetrahydrate.
