= Hexafluorozirconic acid =

Names
- Other names: Dihydrogen hexafluoridozirconate; Fluorozirconic acid; Hydrogen hexafluorozirconate(IV); Hydrogen zirconium fluoride

Identifiers
CAS Number	12021-95-3
3D model (JSmol)	Interactive image
ChemSpider	21241642; hexafluorozirconate: 10329750
ECHA InfoCard	100.031.502
EC Number	234-666-0
PubChem CID	22731701; hexafluorozirconate: 18408020
CompTox Dashboard (EPA)	DTXSID20893178
- InChI: InChI=1S/6FH.Zr/h6*1H;/q;;;;;;+4/p-4 Key: DXIGZHYPWYIZLM-UHFFFAOYSA-J
- SMILES: [H+].[H+].F[Zr-2](F)(F)(F)(F)F

Properties
Chemical formula	F_{6}H_{2}Zr
Molar mass	207.230 g·mol^{−1}
Appearance	white solid
Solubility in water	soluble

Hazards
- GHS labelling
Pictograms	(GHS05: Corrosive) (GHS06: Toxic)
Signal word	Danger
Hazard statements	H290, H301, H311, H314, H331

Related compounds
Related compounds	Lithium hexafluorozirconate; Sodium hexafluorozirconate; Potassium hexafluorozirconate
- Except where otherwise noted, data are given for materials in their standard state (at 25 °C [77 °F], 100 kPa). Infobox references

Hexafluorozirconic acid is an inorganic compound with the idealized chemical formula H_{2}ZrF_{6} that exists in solution. Hydroxonium hexafluorozirconate ((H_{3}O)_{2}ZrF_{6}) is a white solid forming monoclinic crystals.

== Structure ==
Hydroxonium hexafluorozirconate has been characterized by X-ray diffraction. It forms monoclinic crystals (space group: A2/a, a = 6.715 Å, b = 7.187 Å, c = 12.626 Å, γ = 111.85°, Z = 4). It is composed of chains of (ZrF_{6})^{2-}_{n}, located in parallel to each other along coordinate axis x, and H_{3}O^{+} cations.

== Preparation ==
Hexafluorozirconic acid can be prepared by treating zirconium(IV) oxide with hydrofluoric acid. White crystals form upon evaporation of the solution.

== Uses ==
Hexafluorozirconic acid can be used in sealing treatments for phosphated steel. A dilute solution of trimethoxymethylsilane, with enough H_{2}ZrF_{6} to bring the pH down to about 4, is reported to perform better than a chromate rinse. A nickel and chromium(VI) free treatment system for steel and galvanized steel is carried out by washing with an alkaline cleaner, rinsing, treating with hexafluorozirconic acid, rinsing, and then sealing with a solution of epoxy phosphate.
