= Sodium hexafluorozirconate =

Names
- Other names Sodium zirconium fluoride

Identifiers
CAS Number	16925-26-1
3D model (JSmol)	Interactive image
ChemSpider	11221752
ECHA InfoCard	100.037.249
EC Number	240-990-3
PubChem CID	71306924
CompTox Dashboard (EPA)	DTXSID90937614
- InChI: InChI=1S/6FH.2Na.Zr/h6*1H;;;/q;;;;;;2*+1;+4/p-6 Key: KSYURTCLCUKLSF-UHFFFAOYSA-H
- SMILES: F[Zr-2](F)(F)(F)(F)F.[Na+].[Na+]

Properties
Chemical formula	Na_{2}ZrF_{6}
Molar mass	251.19 g/mol
Appearance	white solid

Related compounds
Other cations	Ammonium hexafluorozirconate; Lithium hexafluorozirconate; Potassium hexafluorozirconate
Related compounds	Hexafluorozirconic acid
- Except where otherwise noted, data are given for materials in their standard state (at 25 °C [77 °F], 100 kPa). Infobox references

Sodium hexafluorozirconate or sodium zirconium fluoride is an inorganic compound with the chemical formula Na_{2}ZrF_{6}. It is the sodium salt of hexafluorozirconic acid.

== Structure ==
Sodium hexafluorozirconate exhibits polymorphism; four phases have been characterized. The β phase is hygroscopic.

Phase transition temperatures (°C)
α-β	β-γ	γ-δ
533	505	460

== Uses ==
It is used in the manufacturing of optical glasses and ceramics, as well as in the production of other chemical compounds. Its use has also been researched in the production of red and blue-green phosphors.
