= Fiber pull-out =

One of the failure mechanisms in fiber-reinforced composite materials

Fiber pull-out is one of the failure mechanisms in fiber-reinforced composite materials. Other forms of failure include delamination, intralaminar matrix cracking, longitudinal matrix splitting, fiber/matrix debonding, and fiber fracture. The cause of fiber pull-out and delamination is weak bonding.

Work for debonding, $W_d = \frac{\pi\; d^2\; \sigma_f^2\; l_d}{24\; E_f}$

where

- $d$ is fiber diameter
- $\sigma_f^2$ is failure strength of the fiber
- $l_d$ is the length of the debonded zone
- $E_f$ is fiber modulus

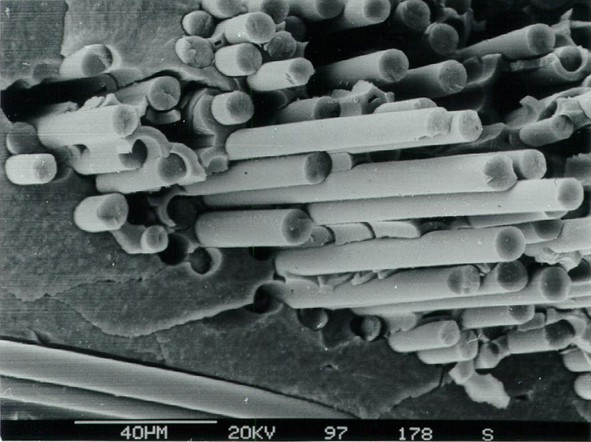

In ceramic matrix composite material this mechanism is not a failure mechanism, but essential for its fracture toughness, which is several factors above that of conventional ceramics.

The figure is an example of how a fracture surface of this material looks like. The strong fibers form bridges over the cracks before they fail at elongations around 0.7%, and thus prevent brittle rupture of the material at 0.05%, especially under thermal shock conditions. This allows using this type of ceramics for heat shields applied for the re-entry of space vehicles, for disk brakes and slide bearing components.
