= Potassium hexafluorozirconate =

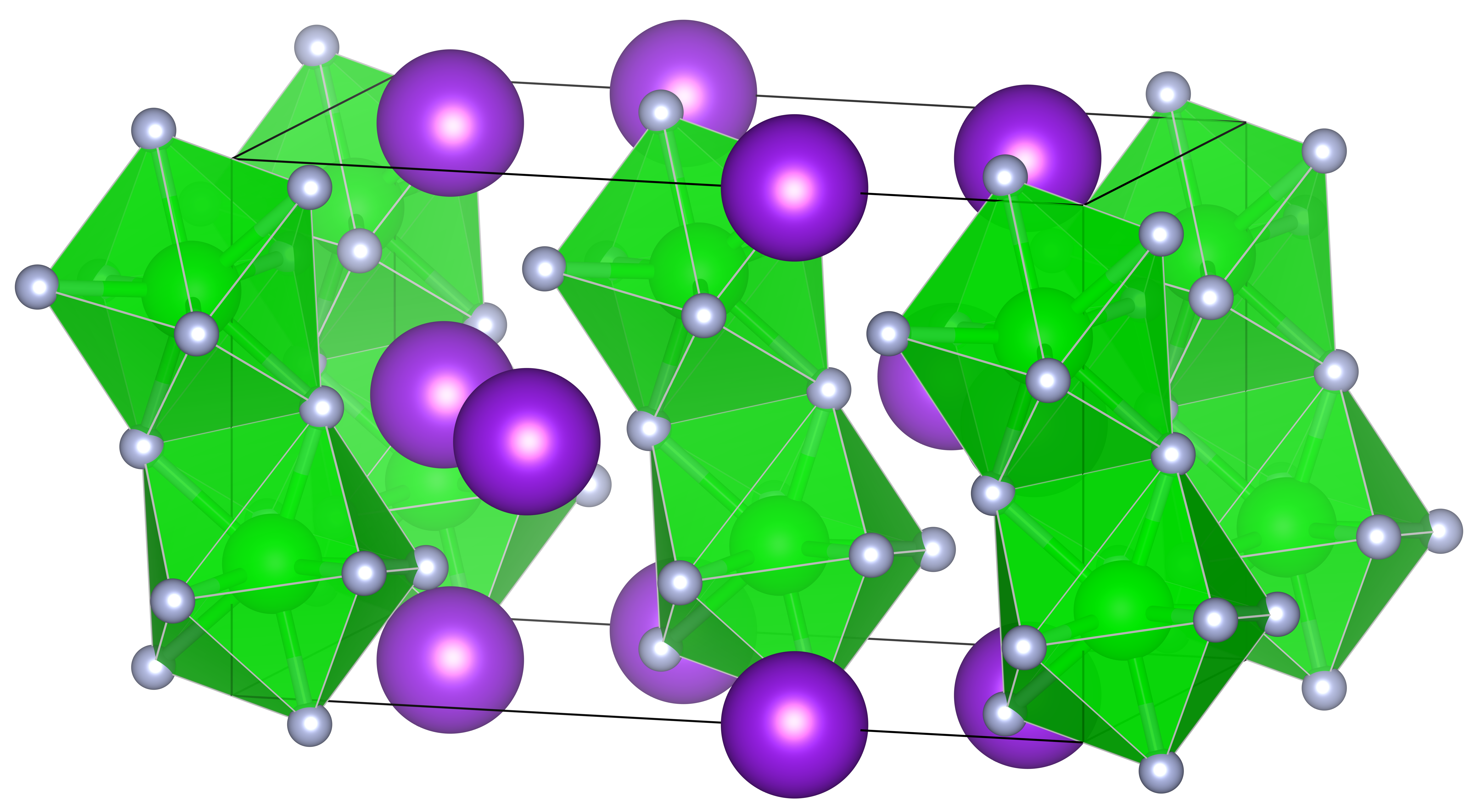

Names
- Other names: Dipotassium hexafluorozirconate; Potassium zirconium hexafluoride; Potassium fluorozirconate

Identifiers
CAS Number	16923-95-8
3D model (JSmol)	Interactive image
ChemSpider	11221760
ECHA InfoCard	100.037.244
EC Number	240-985-6
PubChem CID	56828182
UNII	5KM6NS0WTL
CompTox Dashboard (EPA)	DTXSID00893979
- InChI: InChI=1S/6FH.2K.Zr/h6*1H;;;/q;;;;;;2*+1;+4/p-6 Key: BJZIJOLEWHWTJO-UHFFFAOYSA-H
- SMILES: F[Zr-2](F)(F)(F)(F)F.[K+].[K+]

Properties
Chemical formula	F_{6}K_{2}Zr
Molar mass	283.411 g·mol^{−1}
Appearance	white crystalline powder
Density	3.48 g/cm^{3}
Solubility in water	soluble

Structure
Crystal structure	monoclinic
Space group	C2/c (No. 15)
Lattice constant	a = 6.57 Å, b = 11.44 Å, c = 6.94 Å α = 90°, β = 90.3°, γ = 90°
Formula units (Z)	4 units per cell

Hazards
- GHS labelling
Pictograms	(GHS06: Toxic)
Signal word	Danger
Hazard statements	H301, H315, H319, H335
Precautionary statements	P301, P302, P305, P310, P330, P351, P352

Related compounds
Other cations	Ammonium hexafluorozirconate; Lithium hexafluorozirconate; Sodium hexafluorozirconate
Related compounds	Hexafluorozirconic acid
- Except where otherwise noted, data are given for materials in their standard state (at 25 °C [77 °F], 100 kPa). Infobox references

Potassium hexafluorozirconate is an inorganic compound of potassium, fluorine, and zirconium with the chemical formula K_{2}ZrF_{6}. It is the potassium salt of hexafluorozirconic acid, forming white monoclinic crystals.

== Preparation ==
Potassium hexafluorozirconate can be prepared by precipitation from solution. For example, by mixing potassium fluoride with zirconium tetrafluoride:

2KF + ZrF_{4} → K_{2}ZrF_{6}↓

Similarly, potassium chloride and ammonium hexafluorozirconate may be used:

2KCl + (NH_{4})_{2}ZrF_{6} → K_{2}ZrF_{6}↓ + 2NH_{4}Cl

Also, in industry, it is obtained by sintering zirconium ore concentrates with potassium fluorosilicate at 600–700 °C.

== Uses ==
Potassium hexafluorozirconate is used as an intermediate product in the electrolytic production of metallic zirconium.

It is also used as a flame retardant for wool, grain refining agent in magnesium and aluminum alloys, welding flux, and optical glass component.
