= Reaction bonded silicon carbide =

Reaction bonded silicon carbide, also known as siliconized silicon carbide or SiSiC, is a type of silicon carbide that is manufactured by a chemical reaction between porous carbon or graphite with molten silicon. Due to the left over traces of silicon, reaction bonded silicon carbide is often referred to as siliconized silicon carbide, or its abbreviation SiSiC.

If bulk silicon carbide is produced by sintering of silicon carbide powder, it usually contains traces of chemicals called sintering aids, which are added to support the sintering process by allowing lower sintering temperatures. This type of silicon carbide is often referred to as sintered silicon carbide, or abbreviated to SSiC.

The silicon carbide powder is gained from silicon carbide produced as described in the article silicon carbide.

== Applications ==
Reaction-bonded silicon carbide is used for mechanical seal faces in pumps.
