= Octadecyltrimethoxysilane =

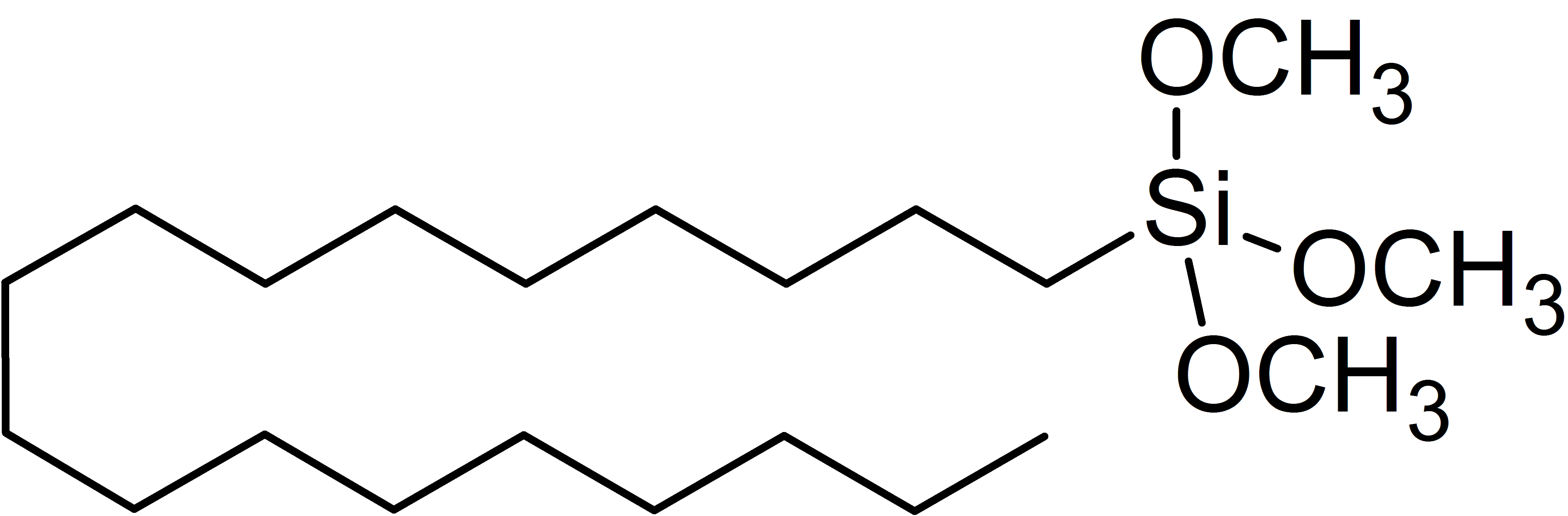
- 2D model of octadecyltrimethoxysilane

Names
- Preferred IUPAC name Trimethoxy(octadecyl)silane
- Other names n-Octadecyltrimethoxysilane; Trimethoxyoctadecylsilane

Identifiers
CAS Number	3069-42-9
3D model (JSmol)	Interactive image; Interactive image
Abbreviations	OTMS
Beilstein Reference	5791830
ChemSpider	68956
ECHA InfoCard	100.019.400
EC Number	221-339-2
MeSH	n-Octadecyltrimethoxysilane
PubChem CID	76486
UNII	A5R7Q56VX6
CompTox Dashboard (EPA)	DTXSID40883733
- InChI: InChI=1S/C21H46O3Si/c1-5-6-7-8-9-10-11-12-13-14-15-16-17-18-19-20-21-25(22-2,23-3)24-4/h5-21H2,1-4H3 Key: SLYCYWCVSGPDFR-UHFFFAOYSA-N; InChI=1/C21H46O3Si/c1-5-6-7-8-9-10-11-12-13-14-15-16-17-18-19-20-21-25(22-2,23-3)24-4/h5-21H2,1-4H3
- SMILES: CCCCCCCCCCCCCCCCCC[Si](OC)(OC)OC; O(C)[Si](OC)(OC)CCCCCCCCCCCCCCCCCC

Properties
Chemical formula	C_{21}H_{46}O_{3}Si
Molar mass	374.681 g·mol^{−1}
Appearance	Colorless liquid
Density	0.883 g cm^{−3}
Melting point	16 to 17 °C (61 to 63 °F; 289 to 290 K)
Boiling point	170 °C (338 °F; 443 K)
Refractive index (n_{D})	1.438-1.44

Hazards
- GHS labelling
Pictograms	(GHS07: Exclamation mark)
Signal word	Warning
Hazard statements	H315, H319, H335
Precautionary statements	P261, P264, P271, P280, P302+P352, P304+P340, P305+P351+P338, P312, P332+P313, P337+P313, P362, P403+P233, P405, P501
NFPA 704 (fire diamond)	2 1 0
- Safety data sheet (SDS)
- Except where otherwise noted, data are given for materials in their standard state (at 25 °C [77 °F], 100 kPa). Infobox references

Octadecyltrimethoxysilane (OTMS) is an organosilicon compound. This colorless liquid is used for preparing hydrophobic coatings and self-assembled monolayers. It is sensitive toward water, irreversibly degrading to a siloxane polymer. It places a C_{18}H_{39}SiO_{3} "cap" on oxide surfaces. The formation of OTMS monolayers is used for converting hydrophilic surfaces to hydrophobic surfaces, e.g. for use in certain areas of nanotechnology and analytical chemistry.

== See also ==
- Methyltrimethoxysilane
- Octadecyltrichlorosilane
