= Methyltrichlorosilane =

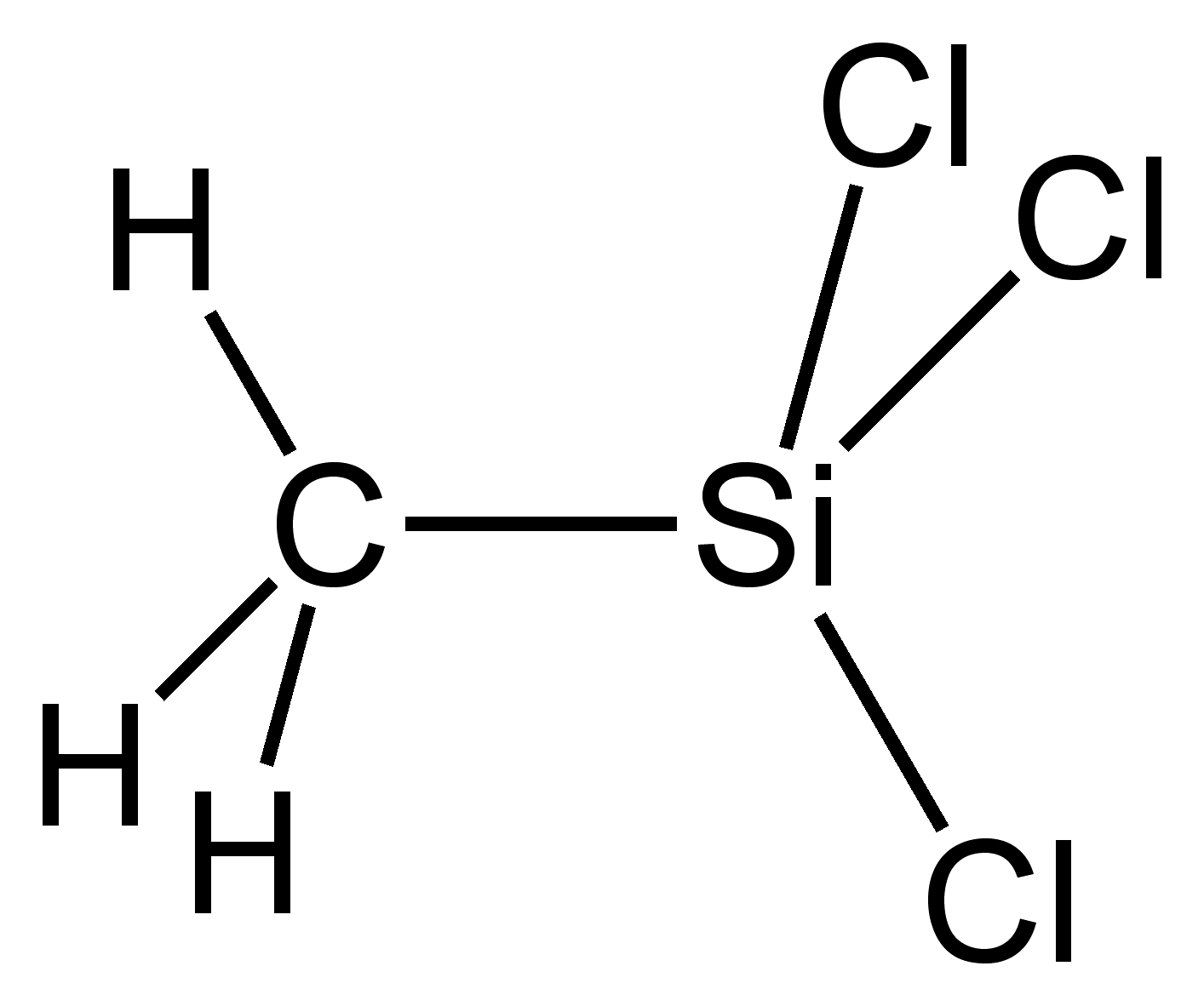

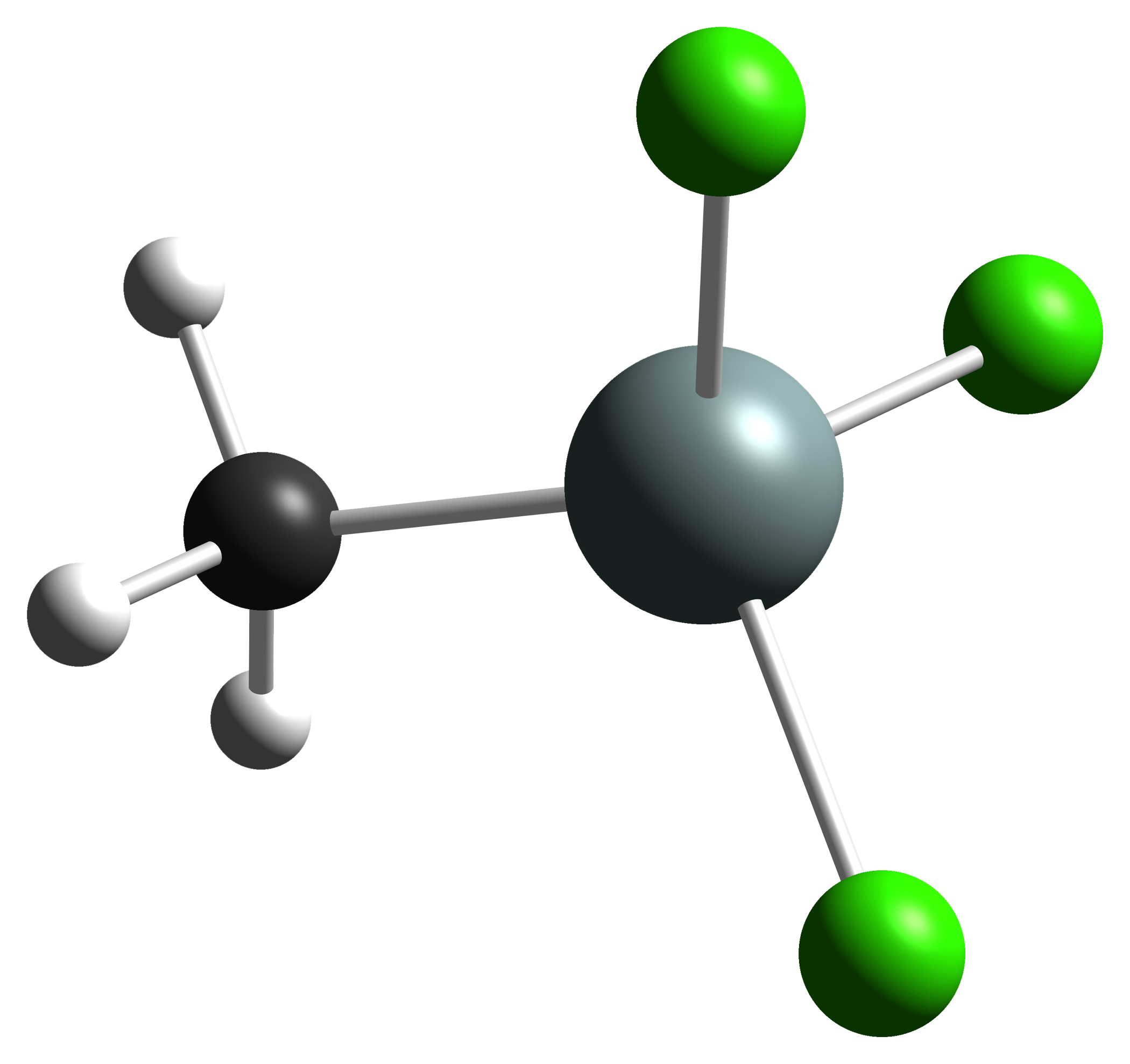

Names
- Preferred IUPAC name Trichloro(methyl)silane
- Other names Methyltrichlorosilane

Identifiers
CAS Number	75-79-6
3D model (JSmol)	Interactive image
ChemSpider	6159
ECHA InfoCard	100.000.821
EC Number	200-902-6
PubChem CID	6399
UNII	UIR5I18638
CompTox Dashboard (EPA)	DTXSID4026426
- InChI: InChI=1S/CH3Cl3Si/c1-5(2,3)4/h1H3 Key: JLUFWMXJHAVVNN-UHFFFAOYSA-N
- SMILES: C[Si](Cl)(Cl)Cl

Properties
Chemical formula	CH_{3}Cl_{3}Si
Molar mass	149.47 g·mol^{−1}
Appearance	Colorless liquid
Density	1.273 g·cm^{−3}
Melting point	−77 °C (−107 °F; 196 K)
Boiling point	66 °C (151 °F; 339 K)
Solubility in water	Reacts with water
Magnetic susceptibility (χ)	−87.45·10^{−6} cm^{3}·mol^{−1}

Hazards
- Occupational safety and health (OHS/OSH)
Main hazards	Highly flammable, reacts with water to release HCl
- GHS labelling
Pictograms	(GHS02: Flammable) (GHS07: Exclamation mark)
Signal word	Danger
Hazard statements	H225, H315, H319, H335
Precautionary statements	P210, P233, P240, P241, P242, P243, P261, P264, P271, P280, P302+P352, P303+P361+P353, P304+P340, P305+P351+P338, P312, P321, P332+P313, P337+P313, P362, P370+P378, P403+P233, P403+P235, P405, P501
NFPA 704 (fire diamond)	3 3 2 W
Flash point	8.0 °C (46.4 °F; 281.1 K)
Autoignition temperature	490 °C (914 °F; 763 K)
Safety data sheet (SDS)	Fischer Scientific MSDS
- Except where otherwise noted, data are given for materials in their standard state (at 25 °C [77 °F], 100 kPa). verify (what is ?) Infobox references

Methyltrichlorosilane, also known as trichloromethylsilane, is a monomer and organosilicon compound with the formula CH_{3}SiCl_{3}. It is a colorless liquid with a sharp odor similar to that of hydrochloric acid. As methyltrichlorosilane is a reactive compound, it is mainly used a precursor for forming various cross-linked siloxane polymers.

== Preparation ==
Methyltrichlorosilane results from the direct process of chloromethane with elemental silicon in the presence of a copper catalyst, usually at a temperature of at least 250 °C.

2 CH_{3}Cl + Si → (CH_{3})_{4−n}SiCl_{n} + other products

While this reaction is the standard in industrial silicone production and is nearly identical to the first direct synthesis of methyltrichlorosilane, the overall process is inefficient with respect to methyltrichlorosilane. Even though dimethyldichlorosilane is usually the major product, if methyltrichlorosilane is needed, the amount of metal catalyst is reduced.

== Reactions ==
=== Hydrolysis and alcoholysis ===
Methyltrichlorosilane undergoes hydrolysis, shown in idealized form here:

MeSiCl_{3} + 3 H_{2}O → MeSi(OH)_{3} + 3 HCl

The silanol is unstable and will eventually condense to give a polymer network:

MeSi(OH)_{3} → MeSiO_{1.5} + 1.5 H_{2}O

Methyltrichlorosilane undergoes alcoholysis (reaction with alcohol) to give alkoxysilanes. Methanol converts it to trimethoxymethylsilane:

MeSiCl_{3} + 3 CH_{3}OH → MeSi(OCH_{3})_{3} + 3 HCl

=== Reduction ===
Reduction of methyltrichlorosilane with alkali metals forms a highly crosslinked material called poly(methylsilyne):

n MeSiCl_{3} + 3n Na →[MeSi]_{n} + 3n NaCl

The reaction illustrates the susceptibility of silicon halides to reductive coupling. Poly(methylsilyne) is soluble in organic solvents, and can be applied to surfaces before being pyrolyzed to give the ceramic material, silicon carbide.

== Applications ==
=== Conversion to polymers and resins ===
One use for methyltrichlorosilane is in the production of methyl silicone resins (highly crosslinked polymers). Because of the stability of the cross-linked polymers resulting from condensation, the resin is stable to 550 °C in a vacuum, making it an ideal material for electrical insulation at high temperatures. These resins can be used to coat computer chips or other electronic parts since they both repel water and provide thermal isolation.

=== Surface treatments ===
Methyltrichlorosilane vapor reacts with water on surfaces to give a thin layer of methylpolysiloxane, which changes the contact angle of the surface to water. This effect arises because of the oriented layer of methyl groups, making a water-repellent film. Filter paper treated with methyltrichlorosilane allows organic solvents to pass through, but not water. Another benefit of such water-repellent films is that the polymers formed are stable: one of the only ways to remove the siloxane film is by acid strong enough to dissolve silicone.

=== Reagent in organic synthesis ===
A combination of methyltrichlorosilane and sodium iodide can be used to cleave carbon-oxygen bonds such as methyl ethers.

R'OR + MeSiCl_{3} + NaI + H_{2}O → R'OH + RI + MeSiCl_{2}(OH) + NaCl

Esters and lactones can also be cleaved with methyltrichlorosilane and sodium iodide to give the corresponding carboxylic acids. Acetals convert to carbonyl compounds. Thus, methyltrichlorosilane can be used to remove acetal protecting groups from carbonyl compounds under mild conditions.

RR'C(OMe)_{2} + MeSiCl_{3} + NaI → RR'CO + 2 MeI + MeSiCl_{2}(OMe) + NaCl

Methyltrichlorosilane and sodium iodide can be used as a means of converting alcohols to their corresponding iodides; however, this reaction does not work as well with primary alcohols.

ROH + MeSiCl_{3} + NaI → RI + MeSiCl_{2}(OH) + NaCl

=== Silicon carbide epitaxy ===
Methyltrichlorosilane is used as a reagent in silicon carbide epitaxy to introduce chloride in the gas phase. Chloride is used to reduce the tendency of silicon to react in the gas phase and thus to increase the growth rate of the process. Methyltrichlorosilane is an alternative to HCl gas or to trichlorosilane.
