= Methyltrimethoxysilane =

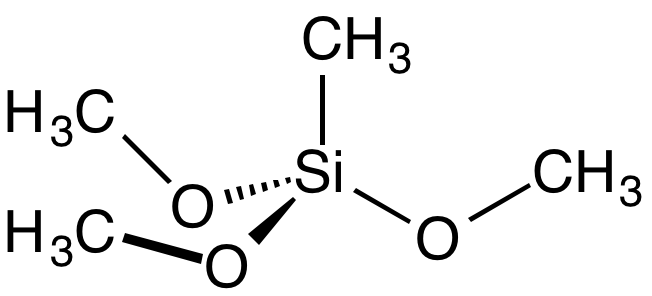

Names
- Preferred IUPAC name Trimethoxy(methyl)silane
- Other names MTM, Trimethoxymethylsilane

Identifiers
CAS Number	1185-55-3
3D model (JSmol)	Interactive image
ChemSpider	13803
ECHA InfoCard	100.013.350
PubChem CID	14456
UNII	0HI0D71MCI
CompTox Dashboard (EPA)	DTXSID3027370
- InChI: InChI=1S/C4H12O3Si/c1-5-8(4,6-2)7-3/h1-4H3 Key: BFXIKLCIZHOAAZ-UHFFFAOYSA-N; InChI=1/C4H12O3Si/c1-5-8(4,6-2)7-3/h1-4H3 Key: BFXIKLCIZHOAAZ-UHFFFAOYAM
- SMILES: CO[Si](C)(OC)OC

Properties
Chemical formula	C_{4}H_{12}O_{3}Si
Molar mass	136.222 g·mol^{−1}
Appearance	Colorless liquid
Density	0.955 g/cm^{3}
Boiling point	102–104 °C (216–219 °F; 375–377 K)
Solubility in water	hydrolysis
- Except where otherwise noted, data are given for materials in their standard state (at 25 °C [77 °F], 100 kPa). Infobox references

Methyltrimethoxysilane is an organosilicon compound with the formula CH_{3}Si(OCH_{3})_{3}. It is a colorless, free-flowing liquid. It is a crosslinker in the preparation of polysiloxane polymers.

== Preparation, structure and reactivity ==
Methyltrimethoxysilane is usually prepared from methyltrichlorosilane and methanol:

CH_{3}SiCl_{3} + 3 CH_{3}OH → CH_{3}Si(OCH_{3})_{3} + 3 HCl

Alcoholysis of alkylchlorosilanes typically proceeds via an S_{N}2 mechanism. Inversion of the configuration is favored during nucleophilic attack when displacing good leaving groups, such as chloride. In contrast, displacement of poor leaving groups, such as alkoxide, retention is favored.

Methyltrimethoxysilane is tetrahedral and is often described as sp^{3} hybridized. It has idealized C_{3v} point symmetry.

Hydrolysis of MTM proceeds both under acidic and basic conditions. Under acid conditions, rates of successive hydrolyses for methyltrimethoxysilane decreases with each step. Under basic condition the opposite is true.

== See also ==
- Octadecyltrimethoxysilane
