= Chemical vapor infiltration =

Ceramic engineering process

Chemical vapour infiltration (CVI) is a ceramic engineering process whereby matrix material is infiltrated into fibrous preforms by the use of reactive gases at elevated temperature to form fiber-reinforced composites. The earliest use of CVI was the infiltration of fibrous alumina with chromium carbide. CVI can be applied to the production of carbon-carbon composites and ceramic-matrix composites. A similar technique is chemical vapour deposition (CVD), the main difference being that the deposition of CVD is on hot bulk surfaces, while CVI deposition is on porous substrates.

== Process ==
Figure 1. Conventional Chemical Vapour Infiltration. • Matrix material carried by the gas ↑ Carrier gas Not drawn to scale

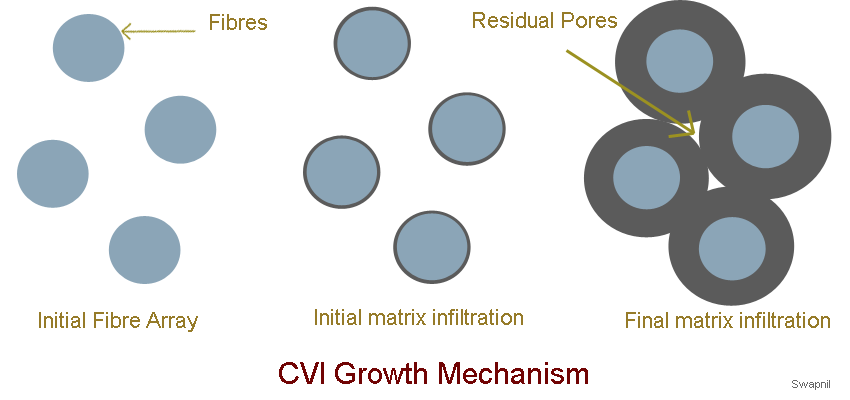
CVI growth. Figure 2.

During chemical vapour infiltration, the fibrous preform is supported on a porous metallic plate through which a mixture of carrier gas along with matrix material is passed at an elevated temperature. The preforms can be made using yarns or woven fabrics, or they can be filament-wound or braided three-dimensional shapes. The infiltration takes place in a reactor, which is connected to an effluent-treatment plant where the gases and residual matrix material are chemically treated. Induction heating is used in a conventional isothermal and isobaric CVI.

A typical demonstration of the process is shown in Figure 1. Here, the gases and matrix material enter the reactor from the feed system at the bottom of the reactor. The fibrous preform undergoes a chemical reaction at high temperature with the matrix material, and thus the latter infiltrates the fiber or preform crevices.

The CVI growth mechanism is shown in Figure 2. Here, as the reaction between the fiber surface and the matrix material takes place, a coating of matrix is formed on the fiber surface while the fiber diameter decreases. The unreacted reactants, along with gases, exit the reactor via the outlet system and are transferred to an effluent treatment plant.

== Modified CVI ==
Figure 3. Modified Chemical Vapour Infiltration. • Matrix material carried by the gas ↑ Carrier gas Not drawn to scale

The ‘hot wall’ technique—isothermal and isobaric CVI, is still widely used. However, the processing time is typically very long and the deposition rate is slow, so new routes have been invented to develop more rapid infiltration techniques: Thermal-gradient CVI with forced flow—In this process, a forced flow of gases and matrix material is used to achieve less porous and more uniformly dense material. Here, the gaseous mixture along with the matrix material is passed at a pressurized flow through the preform or fibrous material. This process is carried out at a temperature gradient from 1050 °C at the water-cooled zone to 1200 °C at the furnace zone. Figure 3 shows the diagrammatic representation of a typical forced-flow CVI (FCVI).

== Types of ceramic matrix composites with process parameters ==
Table 1 : Examples of Different processes of CMCs.

Fiber	Matrix	Common Precursor	Temperature(°C)	Pressure (kpa)	Process
Carbon	Carbon	Kerosene, Methane	Approximate 1000	1	Forced-flow CVI
Carbon	Silicon Carbide	CH_{3}SiCl_{3}-H_{2}	Approximate 1000	1	Forced-flow CVI
Silicon Carbide	Silicon Carbide	CH_{3}SiCl_{3}-H_{2}	900-1100	10-100	Isobaric – Forced-flow CVI
Alumina	Alumina	AlCl_{3} CO_{2}-H_{2}	900-1100	2-3	CVI

== Examples ==
Some examples where CVI process is used in the manufacturing are:

Carbon / Carbon Composites (C/C) Based on a previous study, a PAN-based carbon felt is chosen as a preform, while kerosene is chosen as a precursor. The infiltration of matrix in the preform is performed at 1050 °C for several hours at atmospheric pressure by the FCVI. The inner of the upper surface of preform temperature should be kept at 1050 °C, middle at 1080 °C and the outer at 1020 °C. Nitrogen gas flows through the reactor for safety.

Silicon Carbide / Silicon Carbide (SiC/SiC)

Matrix：CH_{3}SiCl_{3} (g) → SiC(s)+ 3 HCl(g)

Interphase: CH_{4}(g) → C(s)+ 2H_{2}(g)

The SiC fibers serve as a preform which is heated up to about 1000 °C in vacuum and then CH_{4} gas is introduced into the preform as the interlayer between fiber and matrix. This process lasts for 70 minutes under pressure. Next, the methyltrichlorosilane was carried by hydrogen into the chamber. The preform is in SiC matrix for hours at 1000 °C under pressure.

== Advantages of CVI ==
Residual stresses are lower due to lower infiltration temperature. Large complex shapes can be produced. The composite prepared by this method have enhanced mechanical properties, corrosion resistance and thermal-shock resistance. Various matrices and fibre combination can be used to produce different composite properties. (SiC, C, Si_{3}N_{4}, BN, B_{4}C, ZrC, etc.). There is very little damage to fibres and to the geometry of the preform due to low infiltration temperature and pressures. This process gives considerable flexibility in selecting fibers and matrices. Very pure and uniform matrix can be obtained by carefully controlling the purity of gases.

== Disadvantages ==
The residual porosity is about 10 to 15% which is high; the production rate is low; the capital investment, production and processing costs are high.

== Applications ==
CVI is used to build a variety of high-performance components:

- Heat-shield systems for space vehicles.
- High-temperature systems like combustion chambers, turbine blades, stator vanes, and disc brakes which experience extreme thermal shock.
- In the case of burners, high-temperature valves and gas ducts, oxides of CMCs are used. Components of slide bearings for providing corrosion resistance and wear resistance.
