= Over Thirty Months Scheme =

Cattle management scheme

The Over Thirty Months Scheme was a scheme to keep older cattle out of the human foodchain. It was based on the "Over Thirty Months Rule" introduced in the UK on 3 April 1996, as one of several measures to manage the risk associated with bovine spongiform encephalopathy (BSE).

By November 1997, about 1,772,000 cows had been slaughtered under the scheme, with compensation of 1 ecu per kg, reduced to .9 ecu in October 1996, and later to .8 ecu, and later still a 560 kg cap per animal.

The Royal Society of Edinburgh reviewed the scheme in 2003, in view of the steps taken to date, and the introduction of EU testing and inspection regime in 2001.

In November 2004 Farmer's Weekly announced that DEFRA intended to scrap the scheme "as early as July 2005". The scheme was finally abolished in November 2005. At the same time it became illegal to send cattle born before August 1996 to an abattoir for human consumption.

== See also ==
- Feed Ban
- Specified Risk Material Control
- Mechanically recovered meat
