= Heat shield =

Component to protect against excessive heat

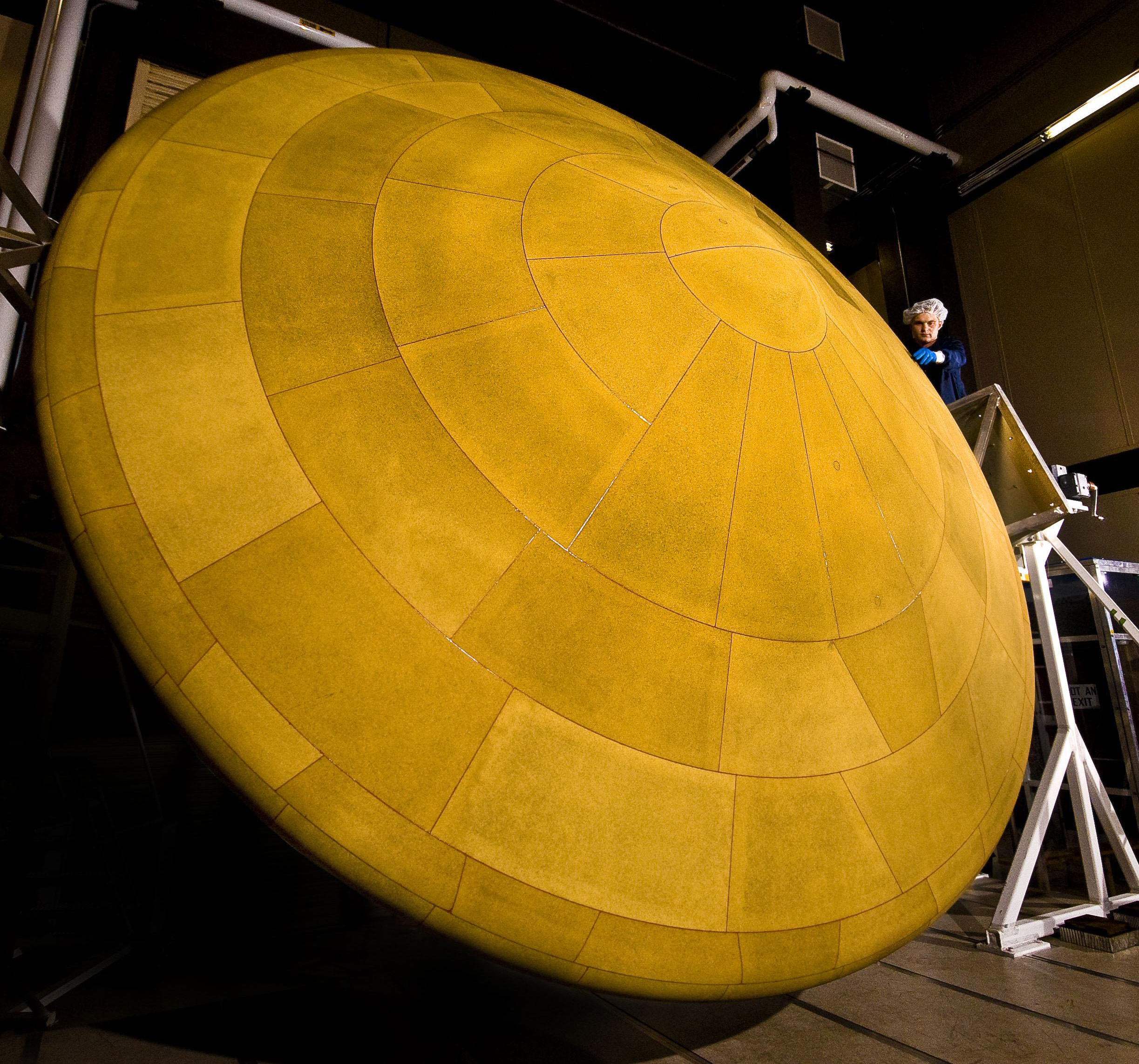
The finished heat shield for NASA's Mars Science Laboratory, with a diameter of 4.5 meters (14 feet, 9 inches)

In engineering, a heat shield is a component designed to protect an object or a human operator from being burnt or overheated by dissipating, reflecting, and/or absorbing heat. The term is most often used in reference to exhaust heat management and to systems for dissipating frictional heat. Heat shields are used most commonly in the automotive and aerospace industries.

== Principles of operation ==
Heat shields protect structures from extreme temperatures and thermal gradients by two primary mechanisms. Thermal insulation and radiative cooling, respectively isolate the underlying structure from high external surface temperatures, while emitting heat outwards through thermal radiation. To achieve good functionality the three attributes required of a heat shield are low thermal conductivity (high thermal resistance), high emissivity, and good thermal stability (refractoriness). Porous ceramics with high emissivity coatings (HECs) are often employed to address these three characteristics, owing to the good thermal stability of ceramics, the thermal insulation of porous materials and the good radiative cooling effects offered by HECs.

== Uses ==
=== Automotive ===
Due to the large amounts of heat given off by internal combustion engines, heat shields are used on most engines to protect components and bodywork from heat damage. As well as protection, effective heat shields can give a performance benefit by reducing engine bay temperatures, therefore reducing the temperature of the air entering the engine. Heat shields vary widely in price, but most are easy to fit, usually by stainless steel clips, high temperature tape or specially designed metal cable ties. There are three main types of automotive heat shield:

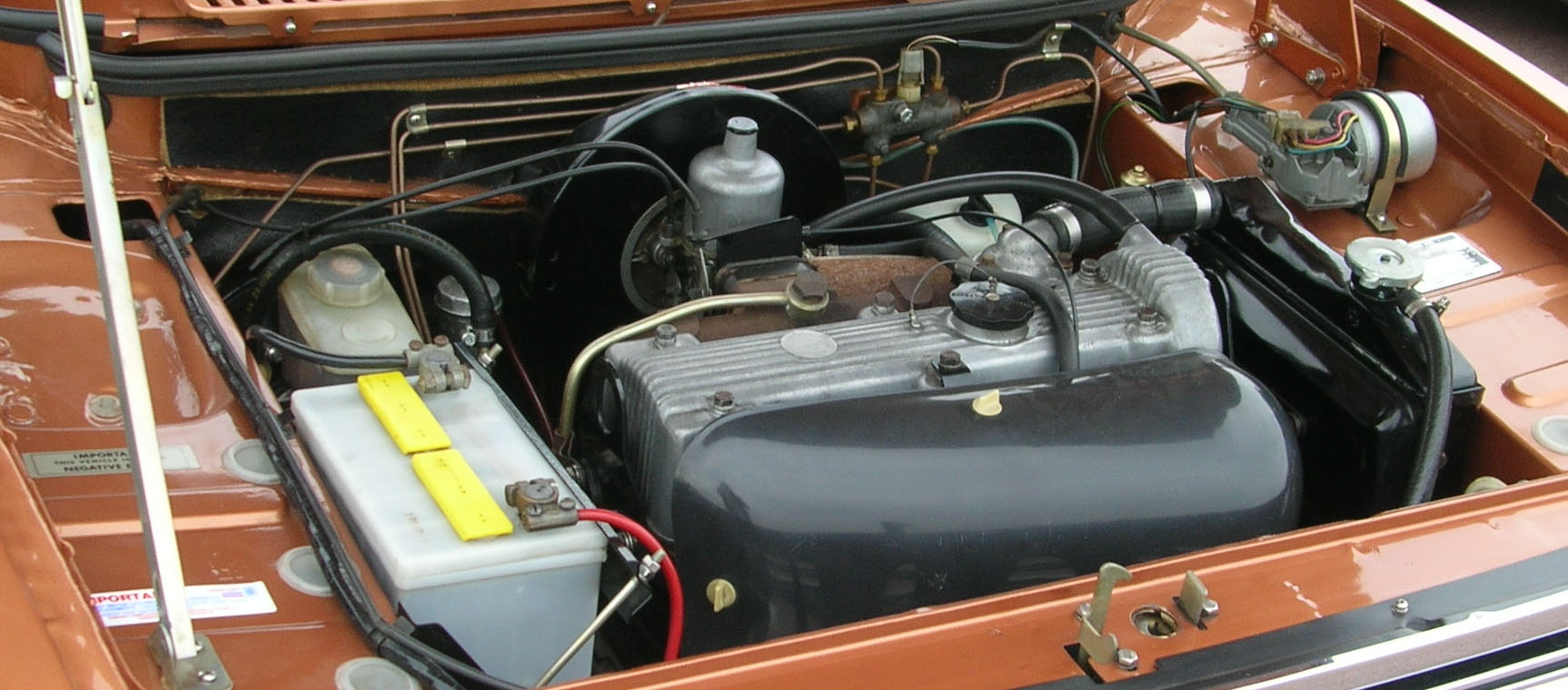
An example of a steel heat shield on a BMW E series engine

Rigid heat shields have until recently commonly been made from solid steel, but are now often made from aluminum. Some high-end rigid heat shields are made out of either aluminum, gold or composite, with most examples including a ceramic coating to provide a thermal barrier, which improves heat insulation. The flexible heat shield are normally made from thin aluminum or gold sheeting, most commonly sold either flat or in a roll. These heat shields are often bent by hand by the installer. High performance flexible heat shields sometimes include extras, such as ceramic insulation applied via plasma spraying. Another common tactic in flexible heat shields is using exotic composite materials to improve thermal insulation and shave weight. These latest products are commonplace in top-end motorsports such as Formula 1.

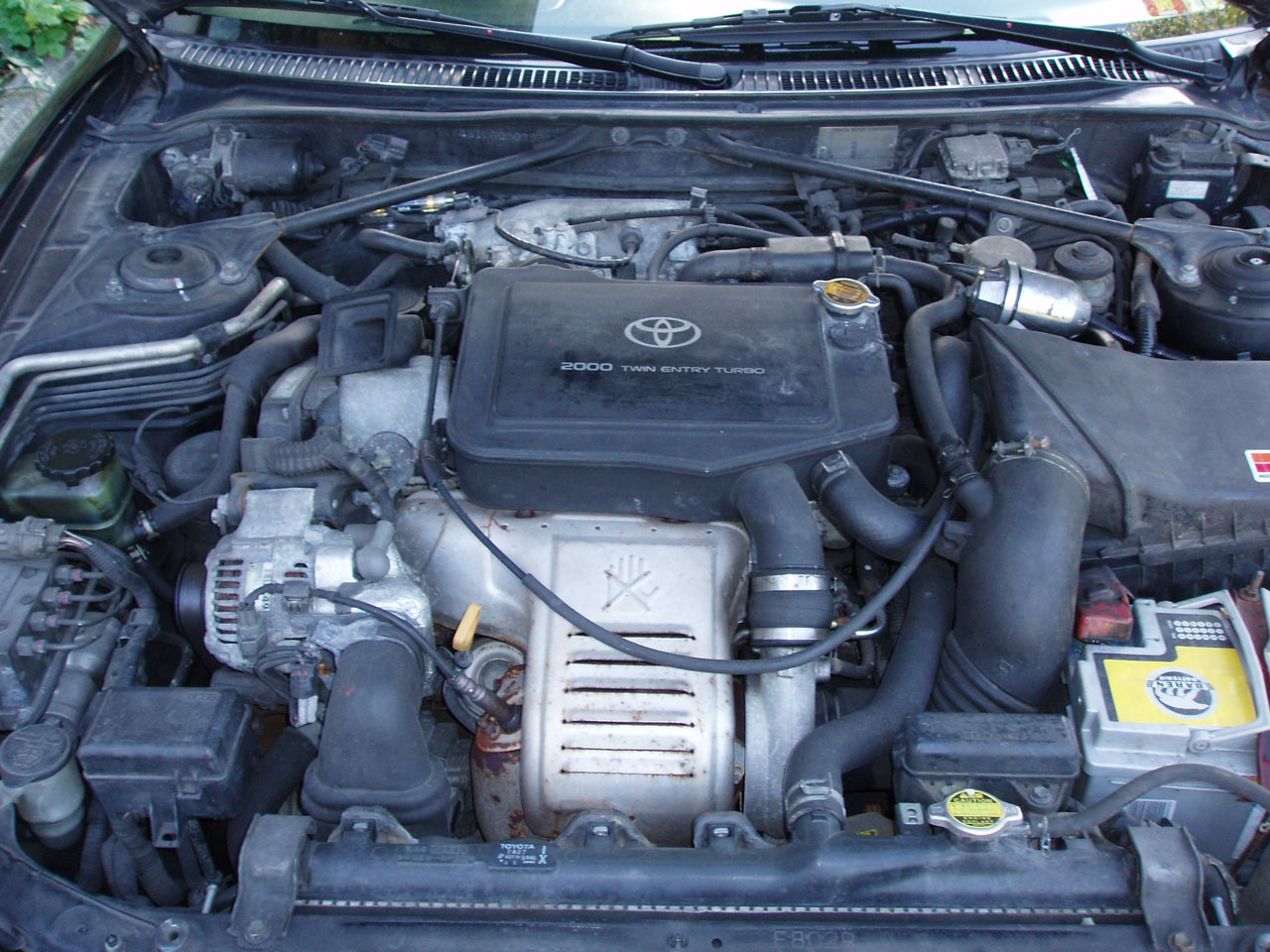
An example of an aluminum heat shield on the Toyota Celica ST205

Textile heat shields, (also known as heat wraps), are used to insulate various exhaust components by trapping the heat emitted by the exhaust inside the exhaust pipe, rather than allowing the immense heat from these components to radiate within the engine bay. These wraps are most common in motorcycle exhaust pipes.

Heat shields are often fitted by both amateur and professional personnel during the optimization phase of engine tuning. Heat shields are also used to cool engine mount vents. When a vehicle is at higher speed there is enough ram air to cool the under-the-hood engine compartment, but when the vehicle is moving at lower speeds or climbing a gradient, engine heat needs to be transferred to other parts around it, e.g. Engine Mounts. With the help of proper thermal analysis and use of heat shields, the engine mount vents can be optimized for the best performances.

=== Aircraft ===
Some aircraft at high speed, such as the Concorde and SR-71 Blackbird, must be designed considering similar, but lower, overheating to what occurs in spacecraft. In the case of the Concorde, the aluminum nose can reach a maximum operating temperature of 127 °C, 180° higher than the surrounding air. The metallurgical consequences associated with the peak temperature were a significant factor in determining the maximum aircraft speed.

Recently new materials have been developed that could be superior to RCC. The prototype SHARP (Slender Hypervelocity Aerothermodynamic Research Probe) is based on ultra-high temperature ceramics such as zirconium diboride (ZrB_{2}) and hafnium diboride (HfB_{2}). The thermal protection system based on these materials would allow to reach a speed of Mach number 7 at sea level, Mach 11 at 35000 meters and significant improvements for vehicles designed for hypersonic speed. The materials used have thermal protection characteristics in a temperature range from 0 °C to + 2000 °C, with melting point at over 3500 °C. They are also structurally more resistant than RCC, so they do not require additional reinforcements, and are very efficient in re-irradiating the absorbed heat. NASA funded (and subsequently discontinued) a research and development program in 2001 for testing this protection system through the University of Montana.

The European Commission funded a research project, C3HARME, under the NMP-19-2015 call of Framework Programmes for Research and Technological Development in 2016 (still ongoing) for the design, development, production and testing of a new class of ultra-refractory ceramic matrix composites reinforced with silicon carbide fibers and carbon fibers suitable for applications in severe aerospace environments.

=== Spacecraft ===
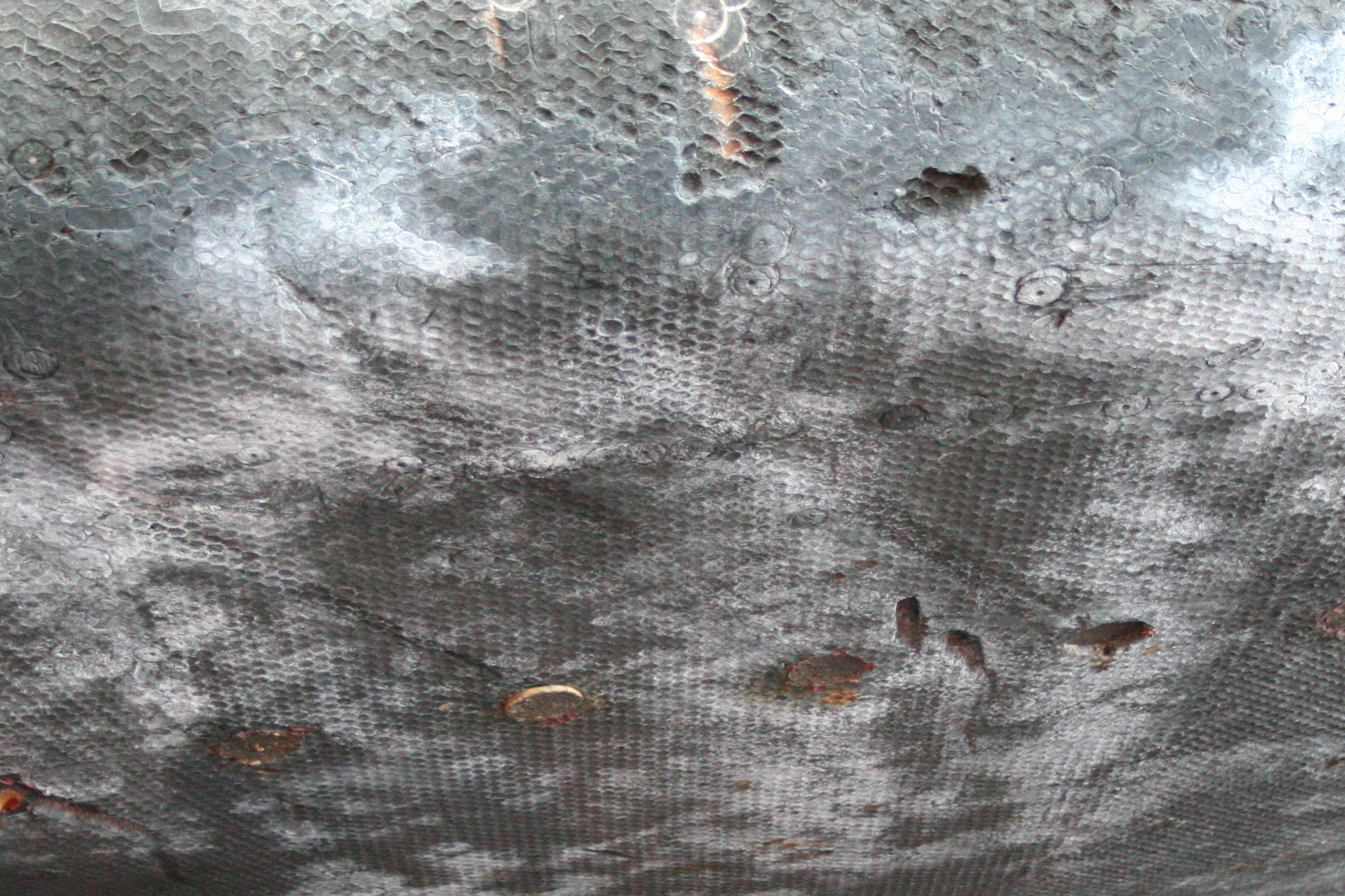
Apollo 12 capsule's ablative heat shield (after use) on display at the Virginia Air and Space Center

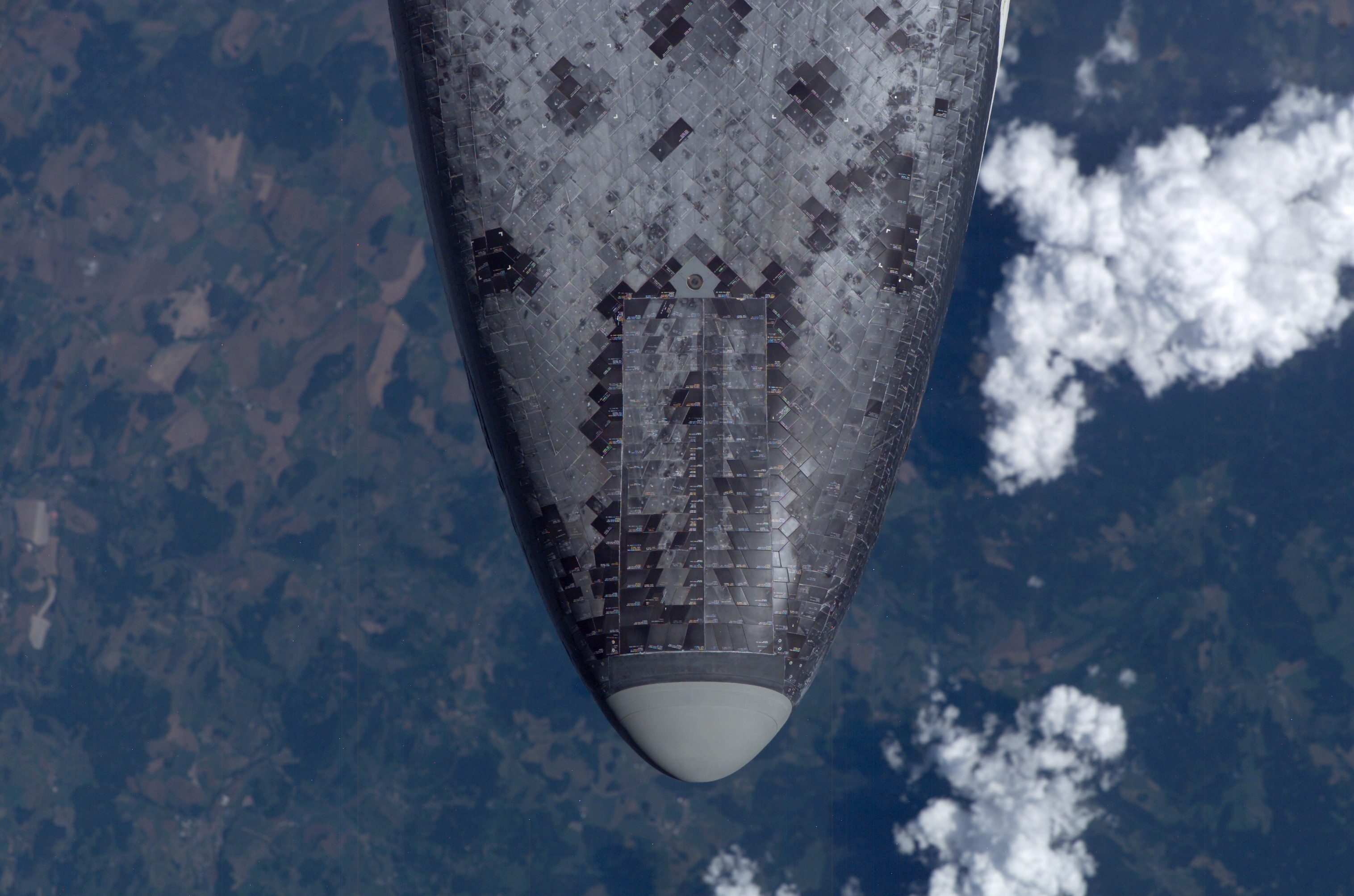
Thermal soak aerodynamic heat shield used on the Space Shuttle

Spacecraft that land on a planet with an atmosphere, such as Earth, Mars, and Venus, currently do so by entering the atmosphere at high speeds, depending on air resistance rather than rocket power to slow them down. A side effect of this method of atmospheric re-entry is aerodynamic heating, which can be highly destructive to the structure of an unprotected or faulty spacecraft. An aerodynamic heat shield consists of a protective layer of special materials to dissipate the heat. Two basic types of aerodynamic heat shield have been used:

- An ablative heat shield consists of a layer of plastic resin, the outer surface of which is heated to a gas, which then carries the heat away by convection. Such shields were used on the Vostok, Voskhod, Mercury, Gemini, and Apollo spacecraft, and are currently used by the SpaceX Dragon 2, Orion, and Soyuz spacecraft.
  - The Soviet Vostok 1, the first crewed spacecraft, used ablative heat shielding made from asbestos fabric in resin. The succeeding Mercury and Gemini missions both used fiber glass in the resin, while the Apollo spacecraft using a quartz fiber reinforced resin. The first use of a super-light ablator (SLA) for spacecraft purposes was for the Viking Landers in 1976. SLA would also be utilized for the Pathfinder mission. Phenolic impregnated carbon ablators (PICA) was used for the Stardust mission launched in 1999.
- A thermal soak heat shield uses an insulating material to absorb and radiate the heat away from the spacecraft structure. This type was used on the Space Shuttle, with the intent for the shield to be reused with minimal refurbishment in between launches. The heat shield on the space shuttle consisted of ceramic or composite tiles over most of the vehicle surface, with reinforced carbon-carbon material on the highest heat load points (the nose and wing leading edges). This protected the orbiter when it reached a temperature of 1,648 degrees Celsius during reentry. The Soviet spaceplane, known as the Buran, also used TPS tiles that are similar to the American Shuttles. With the Buran also using a ceramic tiles on the bottom of the orbiter, and carbon-carbon on the nose cone.
  - Many problems arose with the tiles used on the Space Shuttle, while minor damage to the heat shield was somewhat commonplace. Major damage to the heat shield almost caused the destruction of Space Shuttle Atlantis in 1988 and did cause the loss of Columbia in 2003.

With possible inflatable heat shields, as developed by the US (Low Earth Orbit Flight Test Inflatable Decelerator - LOFTID) and China, single-use rockets like the Space Launch System are considered to be retrofitted with such heat shields to salvage the expensive engines, possibly reducing the costs of launches significantly. On November 10, 2022, LOFTID was launched using an Atlas V rocket and, then, detached in order to reenter the atmosphere. The outer layer of the heat shield consisted of a silicon carbide ceramic. The recovered LOFTID had minimal damage.

=== Passive cooling ===
Passive cooled protectors are used to protect spaceships during atmospheric entry to absorb heat peaks and subsequently radiate heat to the atmosphere. Early versions included a substantial amount of metals such as titanium, beryllium and copper. This greatly increased the mass of the vehicle. Heat absorption and ablative systems became preferable.

In modern vehicles, passive cooling can be found as reinforced carbon–carbon material instead of metal. This material constitutes the thermal protection system of the nose and the front edges of the Space Shuttle and was proposed for the vehicle X-33. Carbon is the most refractory material known with a sublimation temperature (for graphite) of 3825 °C. These characteristics make it a material particularly suitable for passive cooling, but with the disadvantage of being very expensive and fragile. Some spacecraft also use a heat shield (in the conventional automotive sense) to protect fuel tanks and equipment from the heat produced by a large rocket engine. Such shields were used on the Apollo Service Module and Lunar Module descent stage. The Parker Solar Probe, designed to enter the corona of the Sun, experiences a surface temperature of 2,500 °F. To withstand this temperature without damage to its body or instruments, the spacecraft uses a heat shield using a carbon-carbon ceramic with a layer of carbon foam in between. The probe was launched into space on August 18, 2018.

=== Military ===
Heat shields are often affixed to semi-automatic or automatic rifles and shotguns as barrel shrouds in order to protect the user's hands from the heat caused by firing shots in rapid succession. They have also often been affixed to pump-action combat shotguns, allowing the soldier to grasp the barrel while using a bayonet.

=== Industry ===
Heat shields are used in metallurgical industry to protect structural steel of the building or other equipment from the high temperature of nearby liquid metal.

== See also ==
* Aeroshell
- Atmospheric reentry
- AVCOAT
- Components of jet engines
- Intumescent
- Payload fairing
- Starlite
- Sunshield (JWST)
