= Single-photon =

Single-photon may refer to:

- Photon counting devices capable of counting individual photons, for example:
  - Superconducting nanowire single-photon detectors
  - Single-photon avalanche diodes, a class of solid-state photodetectors
- Single-photon sources
- Single-photon emission computed tomography, a nuclear medicine tomographic imaging technique
