= Bayerische Akademie für Außenwirtschaft =

Coordinates: 48.1386°N 11.5210°E

- Other name: BAA
- Type: Private university
- Established: 1989
- Location: Elsenheimerstraße, Munich, Bavaria, Germany

The Bayerische Akademie für Außenwirtschaft e. V. (BAA), [Bavarian Academy for Foreign Trade] headquartered in Munich, was founded in 1989 as a private university of cooperative education and state-approved vocational school for training highly qualified young professional and managerial staff for the international professional world. The Bayerische Akademie is a UNESCO ASPNet. There is an administrative cooperation of the Bavarian Academy for Foreign Trade and the Didact Kfm. Training Company based in Munich, Elsenheimerstraße.

== Study courses ==
The core competencies of the Bayerische Akademie für Außenwirtschaft are business economics, international business, financial services, logistics, transport industry, and facility management. It offers full-time courses and in-service training and continuing education for adults. The BAA with their cooperating state-approved vocational school in particular educates State-Certified International business professionals and offers the Bachelor's degree. Admission is based on the Higher education entrance qualification. For academic postgraduate studies in business administration, in international economics as well as various commercial training are offered. For school leavers with a General Certificate of Secondary Education the BAA offers studies for Euro-Management Assistants. Companies such as BMW, Airbus, VW, Wacker Chemie and Audi have integrated the curricula of the Bayerische Akademie in their house training and encourage their employees to participate in the BAA-examinations.
