= VAA – Chemistry Executives =

VAA : Chemistry Executives is a German organisation for managers and executives in chemical industries. It safeguards the interests of 27,000 members and is one of the most important German professional associations and unions for executives, academics and employees with managerial responsibility.

It was founded in 1919 as the Union of Employed Chemists and Engineers “Budaci”. The VAA champions the material, legal and social interests of its members. It gives them advice on different aspects of working life and tries to provide better labor conditions by negotiating collective agreements. The association offers special legal services for retirees and older employees, who participate in part-time work schemes.

== Structure ==
The VAA represents executive staff, managers, academics, and professionals. Members of the VAA belong to different occupational groups with over 70% of the VAA members having an academic background, many from the field of natural or applied sciences. Thus many of them work as scientists, engineers or managers. But there are also a significant number of economists, agronomists and lawyers working in responsible positions for small and medium enterprises (SMEs), larger companies and corporations in the chemical industry.

The VAA is divided into eight state groups, the structure of which is related to the regional concentration of chemical companies or corporations. The state groups do not adhere to the administrative territory of the sixteen German states. Each state group consists of a certain number of so-called factory groups, which are made up by VAA members on-site in the respective companies. As a rule of thumb: the bigger the company the greater the number of people organized in a factory group. Hence there are strong factory groups in companies like BASF, Bayer, Clariant, Evonik, Henkel, Merck, Roche Diagnostics, Sanofi or Wacker. In case there is no factory group in a company (e.g. in some SMEs), people enter the VAA as single members.

== Politics ==
As a politically independent professional association, the VAA cooperates with its German social partners, the Federal Association of Employers in Chemistry BAVC and the Mining, Chemical and Energy Industrial Union IG BCE. One of the main tasks of the VAA is collective bargaining. Therefore it holds regular talks with the BAVC. The setting-up of a collective agreement for academics and non-tariff employees (i.e. those professionals, who are not covered by the collective agreement between IG BCE and BAVC) can be considered as one of the association's main achievements. Furthermore, the VAA has managed to sign a special collective agreement on annual remuneration for employees in their second professional year.

The VAA also promotes the interests of its members on the political level. It is a member of the German Managers’ Confederation ULA, an interest group for executives which has close links and ties to political players and organisations in both Berlin and Brussels. The VAA is also a member of the European Federation of Managers in the Chemical and Allied Industries FECCIA and the European Confederation of Executives and Managerial Staff CEC.
