= Theaterfestival Spielart =

International theatre festival in Munich

The Theaterfestival Spielart is an international theatre festival which takes place every two years during November and December in Munich, starting in 1995. The festival lasts between 15 and 17 days. Guests usually include over 20 international theater and performance groups.

== History ==
The Spielart Theater Festival has existed since 1995 and continues the traditional theater festival from Thomas Petz in Munich (1979-1985). Spielart mainly consists of independent theater groups that maintain an experimental approach to the theater art form. The program of 1995 stated that Spielart wanted to promote new unconventional theater, which overrides all geographical and thematic restrictions.

The festival has been led by Tilmann Broszat since 1995. He designs the program together with Gottfried Hattinger.

== Structure ==
Sponsoring organization of the theatre festival is the 1979 founded Spielmotor München e.V. , a public-private partnership between BMW and the City of Munich.

== Program ==
Spielart has brought guest performances from renowned international artists to Munich since 1995. The guests include:

- Forced Entertainment (Tim Etchells)
- Dumb Type
- Helena Waldmann
- Needcompany (Jan Lauwers)
- Socìetas Raffaello Sanzio (Romeo Castellucci)
- Teatr Cinema
- Nico and the Navigators
- Marie Brassard
- Jérôme Bel
- Stefan Kaegi (Rimini Protokoll)
- Christoph Marthaler
- Rick Miller
- Plasma
- Alvis Hermanis
- Heiner Goebbels
- Jan Fabre
- Lola Arias

== Venues ==
Spielart does not have its own venue. The guests performances are shown at various locations in Munich. The festival cooperates regularly with the Muffatwerk, the Gasteig, the Munich Kammerspiele, as well as the I-camp / Neues Theater München and the Pathos Transport Theater. Close connections exist with the Institute for Theatre Studies at LMU Munich, and the Bayerische Theaterakademie August Everding.
