= Athanor =

Furnace used in alchemy

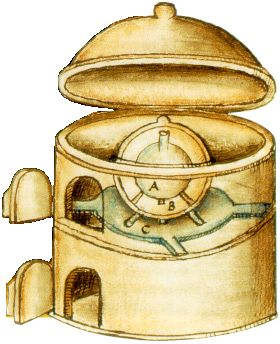
Athanor

In alchemy, an athanor is a furnace used to provide a uniform and constant heat for alchemical digestion.

== Description ==
The first mention of an athanor is in the Life of Apollonius of Tyana, an allegorical description is given of an occult hill named "Athanor". A tandoor is a clay oven and variations of this word appeared via Middle Persian from the Akkadian language. The use of the term athanor originates in alchemy in the medieval Islamic world, which used Arabic: التنور, romanized: at-tannūr, from which the design portrayed evidently descends.

The athanor was also called the piger Henricus "Slow Henry" in Latin because it was chiefly used for slower operations, and because once filled with coals, it would keep burning for a long time. For this reason the Greeks referred to it as "giving no trouble", as it did not need to be continually attended. It was also called the philosophical furnace, furnace of arcana, or popularly the tower furnace.

== Other references ==
"Athanor" is the name of two works by 20th-century German artist Anselm Kiefer: one currently displayed in the Toledo Museum of Art and the other commissioned by the Louvre in 2007 and displayed there.

Sigmar Polke's Golden Lion-winning contribution to the German Pavilion at the 42nd Venice Biennale (1986) was also titled "Athanor". The word was also used the title of a 1968 book of poetry by the Romanian author Gellu Naum, a musical work for orchestra by French composer Joël-François Durand (written in 2001 and premiered by the BBC Symphony Orchestra in 2003), a 1990s noel series by American author Jane Lindskold, a photo collage by Romanian artist Geta Brătescu (b. 1926), and an artwork by Janet Saad-Cook located at Boston University Photonics Center.

The Athanor Academy, founded in 1995 in the German town of Passau, is named after this furnace, as is the Belgian Athanor Loge, a masonic lodge.

The Athanor magazine is a review of language philosophy, history, and international politics, published once or twice a year.
