= David Esrig =

Romanian theater director

David Esrig (Hebrew: דוד אסריג; September 23, 1935 in Haifa — November 22, 2026) was a Romanian theater director.

== Education ==
He studied directing at the Bucharest Caragiale Academy of Theatrical Arts and Cinematography.

== Career ==
In 1995, he founded the Athanor Academy of Performing Arts in Burghausen, which was relocated to Passau in 2014. Esrig was multiple Doctor h.c. in several universities in Romania and Moldova.

== Death ==
David Esrig died on 22 November 2026, at the age of 91.
