= Niobium nanowire =

SEM images showing the evolution of Nb_{2}O_{5} structures over time, with a fixed current applied.

Niobium (Nb) nanowires are nanowires composed of the transition metal Nb, or compounds of Nb such as niobium nitride (NbN) and niobium pentoxide (Nb_{2}O_{5}). These structures occur in the form of a wire, with a diameter on the nanometer scale (10^{−9} m) and unconstrained length. Because these materials are on the nanoscale, Nb nanowires can maintain a measurable electrical resistance even near absolute zero. Synthetic methods for the creation of niobium nanowires include bottom-up and top-down approaches. The superconducting nanowire single-photon detector (SNSPD) is an example of a device made from niobium nanowires primarily in nitride form. Other applications of these nano-structured materials are as electrolytic capacitors, catalysts, and for the proposed genesis of artificial muscle.

== Physical characteristics ==
Niobium nanowires can have physical properties that differ from those of bulk niobium, and their electrical behavior depends on the material: superconducting Nb and NbN nanowires can retain a measurable electrical resistance near absolute zero, while Nb_{2}O_{5} nanowires are semiconductors. This resistance arises from phase slips (or a temporary, random change where the phase of the wave function changes by a multiple of 2π), which occur by two mechanisms. Near the critical temperature, thermal fluctuations cause thermally activated phase slips, which produce a small voltage and a loss of superconductivity and become rarer as the wire is cooled. At low temperatures, quantum phase slips, in which quantum tunnelling suppresses superconductivity, take over as the source of resistance in sufficiently thin wires. Superconducting nanowires narrower than roughly 50 nm can therefore show a nonzero resistance even near absolute zero, with the exact diameter threshold depending on the material and the uniformity of the wire.

== Synthesis ==
Several synthesis methods are reported for niobium nanowires, depending on the form of niobium. These are divided into two categories: bottom-up, which builds nanowires from atoms, molecules, or precursors, or top-down, which starts from bulk niobium or a thin film and patterns or oxidizes it to produce nanowires.

=== Bottom-up ===
NbN can be synthesized in a two-step process starting with a one-dimensional NbSe_{3} precursor. NbSe_{3} nanostructures are annealed in ammonia from 950–1000°C to produce NbN nanowires and nanoribbons with crosssections in the tens of nanometers. Nb_{2}O_{5} can be grown hydrothermally and solvothermally, in a sealed autoclave with water or organic solvent, and dissolved niobium salts. In one hydrothermal study using a niobium oxalate precursor at 180 °C, samples taken over time showed straight rods forming after 15 hrs, with nanowires several micrometers long forming at 25 hrs. This method could suit larger-scale production, as the organic residues wash out with hot water and requires no template. Sol-gel processing and electrospinning can also be used to produce different polymorphs of Nb_{2}O_{5}. In sol-gel synthesis, molecular precursors (metal alkoxides) undergo hydrolysis or alcoholysis to form a gel, which is then dried, made into powder, and calcined. Electrospinning produces longer Nb_{2}O_{5} nanowires than sol-gel, where a solution of niobium precursor with a carrier polymer is put through a syringe needle under a high-voltage field to collect and crystallize the Nb_{2}O_{5} fibers.

=== Top-down ===
An example of depositing an NbN precursor on a SiN_{x} surface during atomic layer deposition, a common method for creating NbN in top-down synthesis of nanowires.

The primary method for top-down synthesis of Nb nanowires is using a deposition technique, such as magnetron sputtering, atomic layer deposition (ALD) or chemical vapor deposition (CVD) to build a thin film, and then using lithography to convert the film to a nanowire structure. Magnetron sputtering is reportedly the most widely used method for preparing NbN thin films. In building NbN nanowires, ALD allows for precise control of film thickness and nitrogen content. Other methods include thermal oxidation of niobium foil. Niobium foil is heated up to 1000°C in a high-oxygen environment, where temperature, time, metal catalysts, and gaseous atmosphere control the diffusion of oxygen to the niobium surface and the formation of Nb_{2}O_{5} nanostructures. Denser Nb_{2}O_{5} nanowires form on a thin oxide film when annealing occurs at restricted oxygen pressure of roughly 400Pa. Anodization synthesis involves a niobium electrode and counter-electrode (normally platinum), where an applied voltage builds up an oxide film on the niobium surface. Electrolyte composition, temperature, current, and time control the nanostructure being formed, and most oxide films formed are amorphous and require crystallization by annealing.

== Potential Applications ==
=== Superconducting Nanowire Single Photon Detectors (SNSPDs) ===
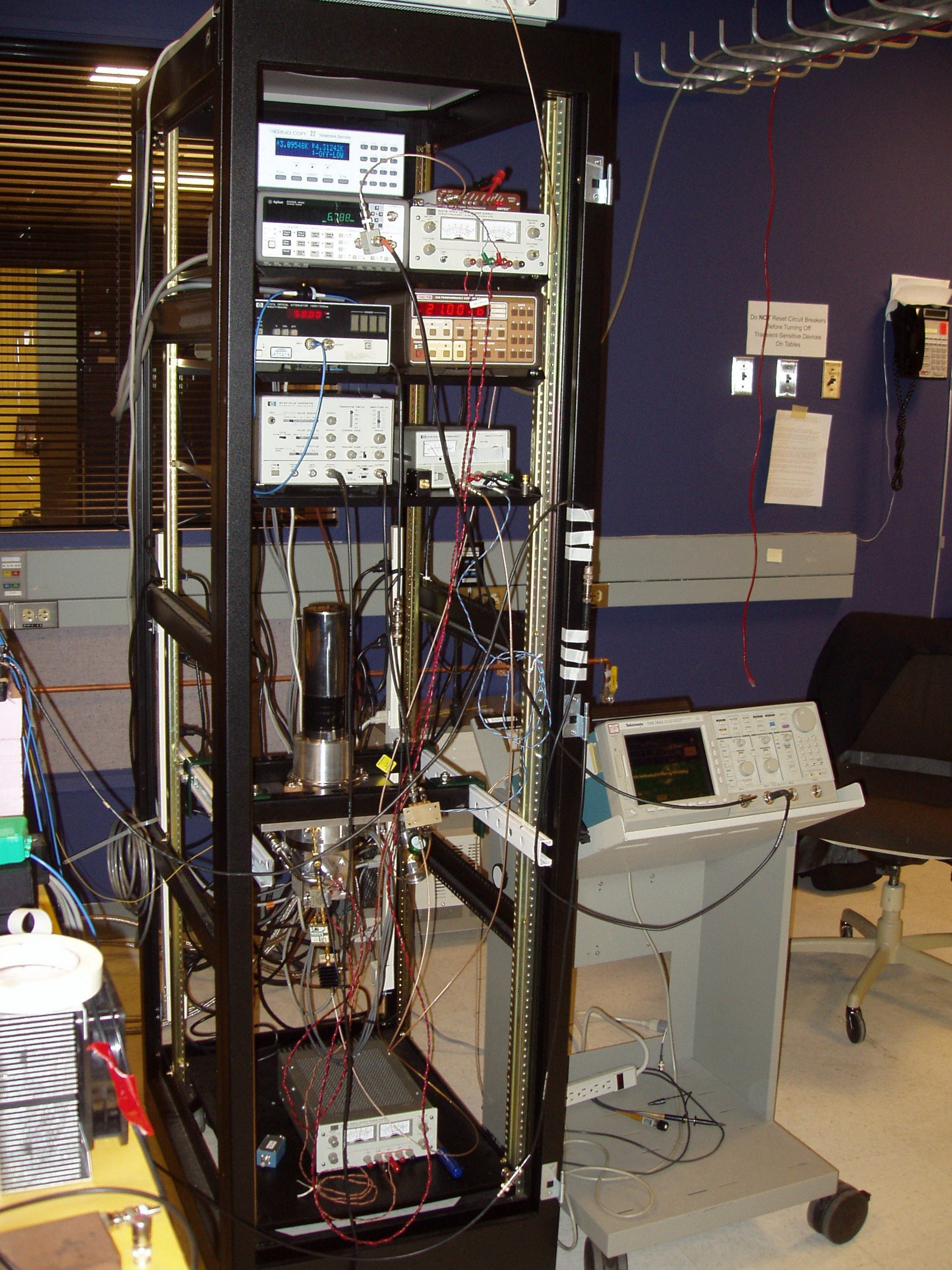
Equipment rack for a superconducting nanowire single-photon detector (SNSPD) system installed in the DARPA Quantum Network at BBN Technologies in June 2005. The detector was developed through a collaboration among NIST Boulder, the University of Rochester, and BBN Technologies.

The most prominent application for niobium nanowires is the superconducting nanowire single photon detector (SNSPD), first developed in 2001 by scientists at Moscow State Pedagogical University and at the University of Rochester using superconducting NbN nanowires. The most common implementation of SNSPDs is based on NbN nanowires typically about 50–100nm wide, patterned from a thin film roughly 5–10nm thick in a top-down synthetic method. The nanowire is then current-biased and in a steady-state prior to photon absorption. As of 2026, the theoretical understanding of the mechanism of detection by niobium nanowires in SNSPDs is under development. For quantitative modeling, the mechanism for detection has been simplified to a five-step macroscopic explanation, including the absorption of a photon leading to a disruption of the superconductivity of the wire and redirection of the current towards a readout detector. The voltage pulses indicate a single-photon event.

=== Catalysis ===
Niobium oxide nanowires, specifically in the form Nb_{2}O_{5}, have been investigated for their catalytic properties. Niobium oxide nanowires in the “tief-tief” (German for “low-low”) phase (TT-Nb_{2}O_{5}) were found to be a photocatalyst for the evolution of H_{2} or O_{2} with enhanced activity compared with conventional bulk TT-Nb_{2}O_{5}. Photocatalytic hydrogen and oxygen evolution are the two half-reactions of water splitting, which is studied as a way to produce hydrogen fuel using light. Nb_{2}O_{5} nanowires in DMSO have also been evaluated as catalysts for converting xylose, a sugar from plant biomass, into furfural, a platform chemical for renewable fuels and chemicals.

=== Artificial Muscles ===
Composite copper-niobium nanowire “yarn” impregnated with paraffin wax creates torsional artificial muscle. The yarn generates linear and torsional motion when the wax undergoes thermal expansion. The nanowire yarn expands and untwists with heat, and retwists when cooled. At room temperature, Nb yarns have a conductivity on the order of 10^{6} S*m^{-1}, higher than that of carbon nanotube yarns. In this case, niobium nanowires act as a sensor to measure the tension applied by the fiber. In application, the yarn could be used as an actuator in robotics or prosthetics.
