= DARPA Quantum Network =

Quantum key distribution network

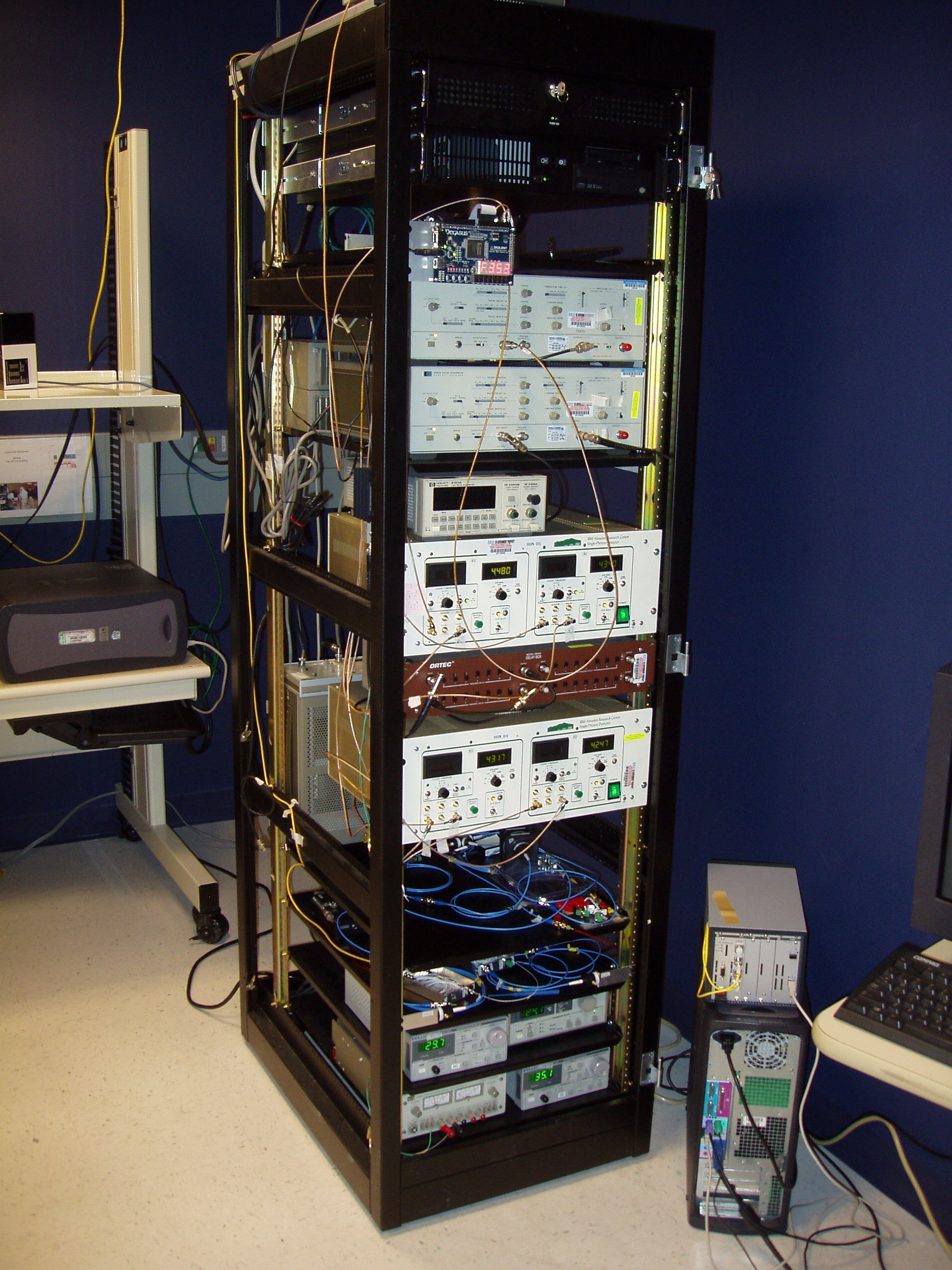
Barb, the entanglement-based receiver, in 2004.

The DARPA Quantum Network (2002–2007) was the world's first quantum key distribution (QKD) network, operating 10 optical nodes across Boston and Cambridge, Massachusetts. It became fully operational on October 23, 2003 in BBN's laboratories, and in June 2004 was fielded through dark fiber under the streets of Cambridge and Boston, where it ran continuously for over 3 years. The project also created and fielded the world's first superconducting nanowire single-photon detector. It was sponsored by DARPA as part of the QuIST program, and built and operated by BBN Technologies in close collaboration with colleagues at Harvard University and the Boston University Photonics Center.

The DARPA Quantum Network was fully compatible with standard Internet technology, and could provide QKD-derived key material to create Virtual Private Networks, to support IPsec or other authentication, or for any other purpose. All control mechanisms and protocols were implemented in the Unix kernel and field-programmable gate arrays. QKD-derived key material was routinely used for video-conferencing or other applications.

The DARPA Quantum Network was built in stages. In the project's first year (year 1), BBN designed and built a full QKD system (Alice and Bob), with an attenuated laser source (~ 0.1 mean photon number) running through telecom fiber, phase-modulated via an actively stabilized Mach-Zender interferometer. BBN also implemented a full suite of industrial-strength QKD protocols based on BB84. In year 2, BBN created two 'Mark 2' versions of this system (4 nodes) with commercial-quality InGaAs detectors created by IBM Research. These 4 nodes ran continuously in BBN's laboratory from October 2003, then two were deployed at Harvard and Boston University in June 2004, when the network began running continuously across the metro Boston area, 24x7. In year 3, the network expanded to 8 nodes with the addition of an entanglement-based system (derived from work at Boston University) designed for telecom fibers, and a high-speed atmospheric (freespace) link designed and built by the National Institute of Standards and Technology. In year 4, BBN added a second freespace link to the overall network, using nodes created by Qinetiq, and investigated improved QKD protocols and detectors. Finally, in year 5, BBN added the world's first superconducting nanowire single-photon detector to the operational network. It was created by a collaboration between researchers at BBN, the University of Rochester, and the National Institute of Standards and Technology; that first 100 MHz system ran 20x faster than any existing single-photon detector at telecom wavelengths. In that final year, BBN also collaborated with researchers at the Massachusetts Institute of Technology to implement, and experiment with, a proof-of-concept version of the world's first quantum eavesdropper (Eve).

When fully built, the network's 10 nodes were as follows. All ran BBN's quantum key distribution and quantum network protocols so they inter-operated to achieve any-to-any key distribution.

- Alice, Bob – 5 MHz, attenuated laser pulses through telecom fiber, phase-modulated
- Anna, Boris – 5 MHz, attenuated laser pulses through telecom fiber, phase-modulated
- Alex, Barb – entanglement based photons through telecom fiber, polarization-modulated
- Ali, Baba – approximately 400 MHz, attenuated laser pulses through the atmosphere, polarization-modulated
- Amanda, Brian – attenuated laser pulses through the atmosphere, polarization-modulated

The DARPA Quantum Network implemented a variety of quantum key distribution protocols, to explore their properties. All were integrated into a single, production-quality protocol stack. Authentication was based on public keys, shared private keys, or a combination of the two. (The shared private keys could be refreshed by QKD-derived keys.) Privacy amplification was implemented via GF[2n] Universal Hash. Entropy estimation was based on Rényi entropy, and implemented by BBBSS 92, Slutsky, Myers / Pearson, and Shor / Preskill protocols. Error correction was implemented by a BBN variant of the Cascade protocol, or the BBN Niagara protocol which provided efficient, one-pass operation near the Shannon limit via forward error correction based on low-density parity-check codes (LDPC). Sifting was performed either by traditional methods, run-length encoding, or so-called "SARG" sifting.

It also implemented two major forms of QKD networking protocols. First, key relay employed "trusted" nodes in the network to relay materials for key distillation between the two endpoints. This approach permitted nodes to agree upon shared key material even if they were implemented via two incompatible technologies; for example, a node based on phase-modulation through fiber could exchange keys with one based on polarization-modulation through the atmosphere. In fact, it even permitted transmitters to share key material with other (compatible or incompatible) transmitters. Furthermore, the raw key material could be routed by multiple "striped" paths through the network (e.g. disjoint paths) and recombined end-to-end, thus erasing the advantage that Eve would gain by controlling one of the network nodes along the way. Second, QKD-aware optical routing protocols enabled nodes to control transparent optical switches within the network, so that multiple QKD systems could share the same optical network infrastructure.

== Selected papers ==
- "Building the quantum network", Chip Elliott, in New Journal of Physics, July 2002.
- "Quantum cryptography in practice", Chip Elliott, David Pearson, Gregory Troxel, ACM SIGCOMM 2002.
- "Path-length control in an interferometric QKD link", Chip Elliott, Oleksiy Pikalo, John Schlafer, Greg Troxel, Proceedings AeroSense 2003, Volume 5105, Quantum Information and Computation, 2003.
- "The DARPA Quantum Network", Chip Elliott, December 2004.
- "Current status of the DARPA Quantum Network", Chip Elliott, Alexander Colvin, David Pearson, Oleksiy Pikalo, John Schlafer, Henry Yeh, SPIE Defense + Commercial Sensing 2005.
- "Building a QKD Network out of Theories and Devices" (slide presentation), David Pearson,
- "The DARPA Quantum Network", C. Elliott, in Quantum Communications and Cryptography, edited by Alexander V. Sergienko, CRC Press, 2005.
- "On the Optimal Mean Photon Number for Quantum Cryptography", David Pearson and Chip Elliott, in Computer Science and Quantum Computing, edited by James E. Stones, Nova Science Publishers, 2007.
- DARPA Quantum Network Testbed: Final Technical Report, Chip Elliott and Henry Yeh, BBN Technologies, July 2007.
- "The Networking in Quantum Networking", Chip Elliott, 2018.
