= Athanor Academy =

Athanor Academy of Performing Arts Passau
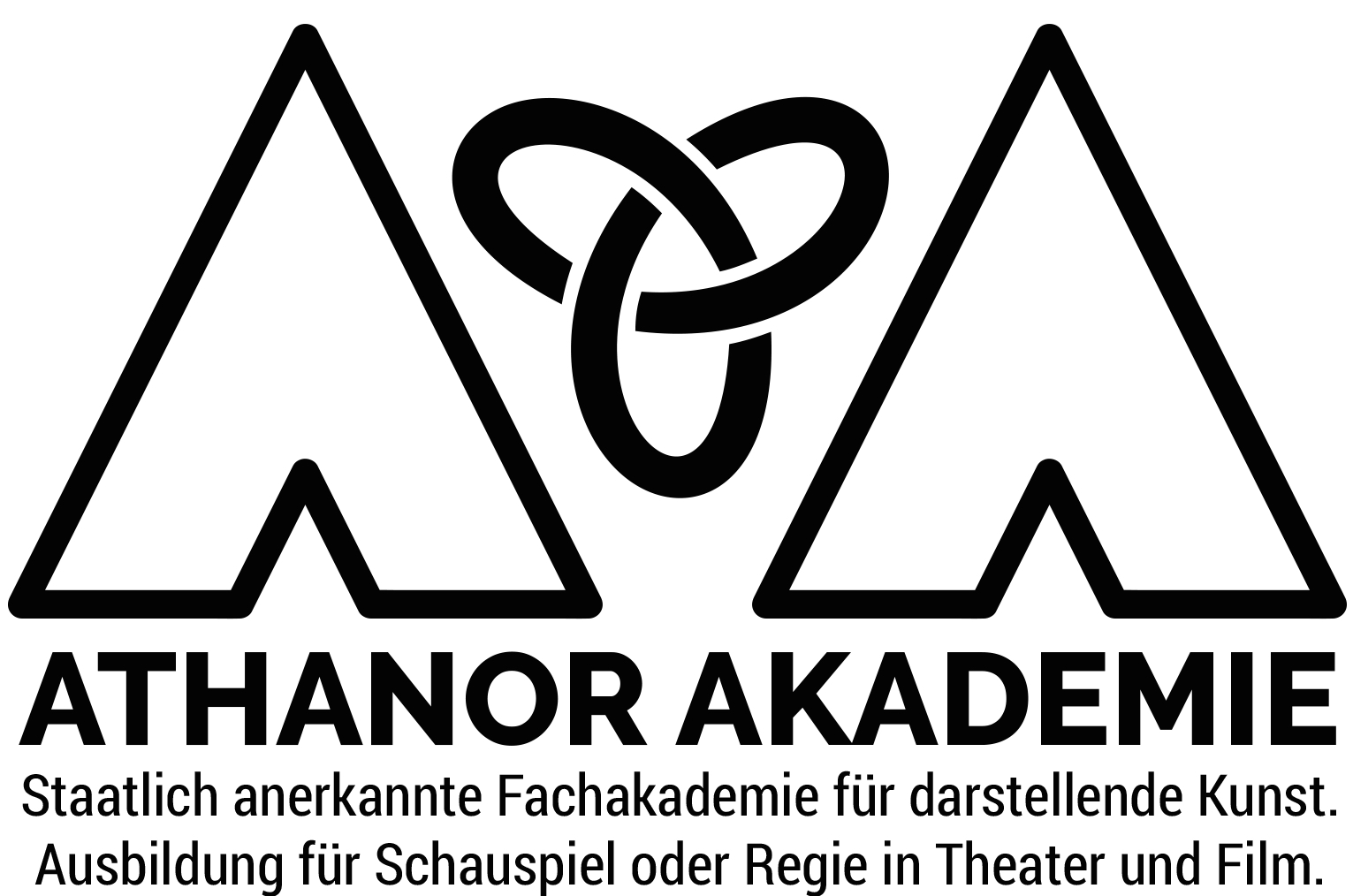

Location
- Schulbergstr. 30; 94034 Passau, Germany
- Coordinates: 48°35′06″N 13°29′48″E

Information
- Type: Fachakademie
- Established: 1995
- Dean: David Esrig
- Faculty: around 25
- Enrollment: around 50
- Website: athanor.de

The Athanor Academy of Performing Arts Passau (Athanor Akademie für Darstellende Kunst Passau) is a Bavarian higher education academy. It is a federally approved Fachakademie in private ownership training actors and directors in theatre and film.

== History ==
Originally founded in Burghausen in 1995 by Romanian director David Esrig, the Athanor Academy was located in the Burg zu Burghausen in Oberbayern. In 2014, the academy was relocated to a former primary school in Passau. The Athanor Academy is a member of several institutions, including the International Theatre Institute ITI.

== Education ==
The degree is a state approved diploma as actor or director and is equivalent to a higher education (BA) as actor or director. The formation lasts 4 years and is held 5 days per week. The monthly fee is 180€, the education is entitled to be supported by the BAföG. Around 50 students study and 25 teachers work there. So far, around 120 alumni have studied at the Athanor Academy since its foundation in 1995. The courses are structured according to nine basic dramatic categories:

- performance
- dramatic space (stage, screen)
- language
- body
- rhythm and sound
- acting
- directing (mise-en-scene)
- theatre and film aesthetics
- market structures

The Academy is based on a teaching method developed by David Esrig, which is described in the book The Road to the Performance by the David Esrig Method by Florin Vidamski., also a teacher at the Academy. Since its foundation, there have been strong ties with the Romanian theatre

== Etymology ==
The academy's name is derived from Athanor, a furnace that was used for alchemical digestion.
