= Dominik Rohracker =

German footballer (born 1989)

Personal information
- Date of birth: 9 January 1989 (age 37)
- Place of birth: Burghausen, West Germany
- Positions: Midfielder; forward

Team information
- Current team: SV Elversberg
- Number: 16

Youth career
- –2001: SV Gendorf Burgkirchen
- 2001–2007: Bayern Munich

Senior career*
Years	Team	Apps	(Gls)
2007–2010	Bayern Munich II	24	(0)
2010–2012	SV Sandhausen	27	(2)
2012–2013	SpVgg Unterhaching	37	(6)
2013–	SV Elversberg	19	(1)
- * Club domestic league appearances and goals as of 22 January 2014

Dominik Rohracker (born 9 January 1989) is a German footballer who plays as a midfielder or forward for SV Elversberg.

== Career ==
Rohracker came through the youth setup of Bayern Munich, and broke into the reserve team with a couple of appearances in the Regionalliga Süd at the beginning of the 2007–08 season. In the summer of 2008, he travelled with Bayern's first-team on a pre-season tour of Asia, as many players had not returned from Euro 2008, and he featured in a friendly against the Indonesia national team, as a last-minute substitute for Jan Schlaudraff.

Despite this, Rohracker didn't make his debut in the 3. Liga until April 2009, when he replaced Stefan Rieß in a 2–1 win over Jahn Regensburg. He made 21 more appearances for Bayern Munich II without getting on the score sheet, before being released by the club in July 2010, and signing for SV Sandhausen. He made nineteen appearances in his first season for the club, scoring twice, but only played the first eight matches of the following season as Sandhausen won the 3. Liga title. He was released on a free transfer, and returned to Munich to sign for SpVgg Unterhaching, where he was a first-team regular during the 2012–13 season. He signed for SV Elversberg in August 2013.

== Honours ==
- 3. Liga: 2012
