= Thermal laser epitaxy =

Thermal laser epitaxy (TLE) is a physical vapor deposition technique that utilizes irradiation from continuous-wave lasers to heat sources locally for growing films on a substrate. This technique can be performed under ultra-high vacuum pressure or in the presence of a background atmosphere, such as ozone, to deposit oxide films.

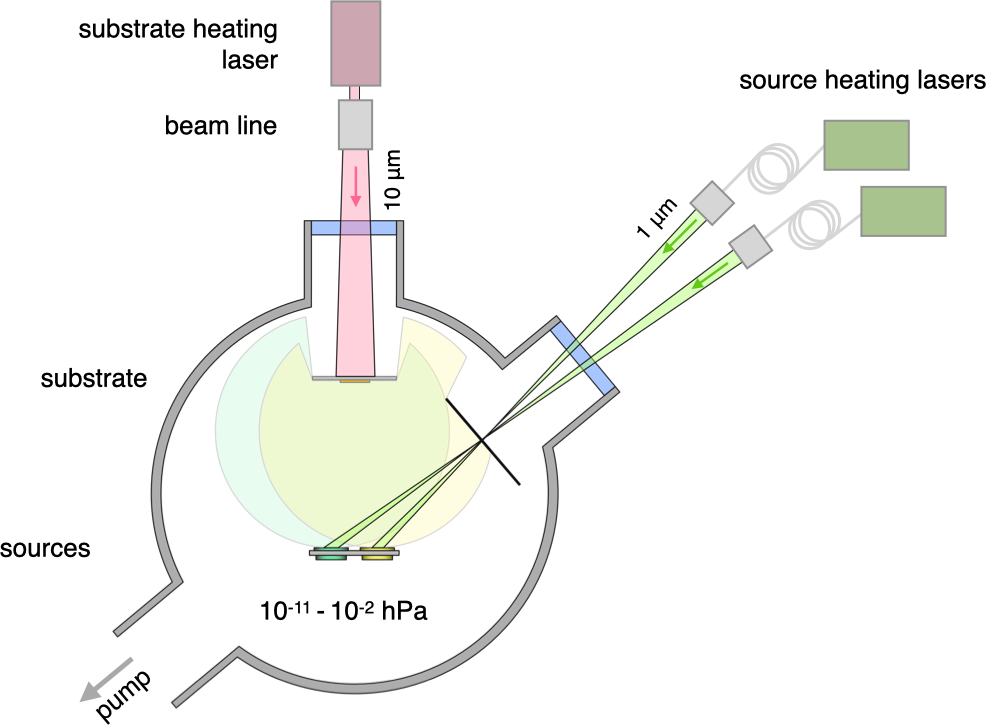
Diagram of a TLE chamber. Continuous-wave lasers are focused on sources inside a vacuum chamber. The localized heating induced by these lasers creates a flux of vapor from each source, which is then deposited onto a heated substrate. A gaseous atmosphere can be introduced via a gas inlet to grow compounds such as oxides.

TLE operates at power densities between 10^{4} – 10^{6} W/cm^{2}, which results in evaporation or sublimation of the source material, with no plasma or high-energy particle species being produced. Despite operating at comparatively low power densities, TLE is capable of depositing many materials with low vapor pressures, including refractory metals, a process that is challenging to perform with molecular beam epitaxy.

== Physical process ==
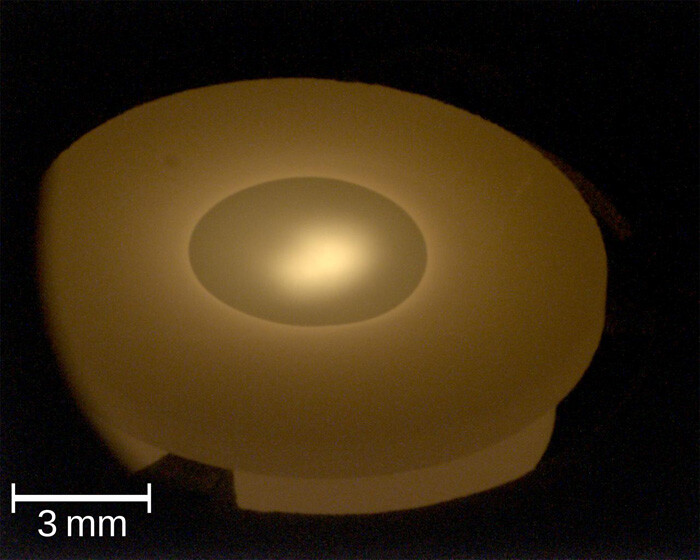
Photograph of a freestanding silicon disc being heated locally by a laser in a TLE chamber.

TLE uses continuous-wave lasers (typically with a wavelength of around 1000 nm) located outside the vacuum chamber to heat sources of material in order to generate a flux of vapor via evaporation or sublimation. Owing to the localized nature of the heat induced by the laser, a portion of the source may be transformed into a liquid state while the rest remains solid, such that the source acts as its own crucible. The strong absorption of light causes the laser-induced heat to be highly localized via the small diameter of the laser beam, which can also have the effect of confining the heat to the axis of the source. The resulting absorption corresponds to a typical photon penetration depth on the order of 2 nm due to the high absorption coefficients of α ~ 10^{5} cm^{−1} of many materials. Heat loss via conduction and radiation further localizes the high-temperature region close to the irradiated surface of the source. The localized character of the heating enables many materials to be grown by TLE from freestanding sources without a crucible. Owing to the direct transfer of energy from the laser to the source, TLE is more efficient than other evaporation techniques such as evaporation and molecular beam epitaxy, which typically rely on wire-based Joule heaters to reach high temperatures.

By heating the source, a flux of vapor is produced, the pressure of which frequently has an approximately exponential relation to temperature. The vapor is then deposited onto a laser-heated substrate. The very high substrate temperatures achievable by laser heating allow the use of adsorption-controlled growth modes, similar to molecular beam epitaxy, ensuring precise control of the stoichiometry and temperature of the deposited film. This precise control is valuable for growing thin-film heterostructures of complex materials, such as high-T_{c} superconductors. By positioning all lasers outside of the evaporation chamber, contamination can be reduced compared to using in situ heaters, resulting in highly pure deposited films.

The deposition rate of the vapor impinging upon the substrate is controlled by adjusting the power of the incident source laser. The deposition rate frequently increases exponentially with source temperature, which in turn increases linearly with incident laser power. Stability in the deposition rate may be achieved by continuously moving the laser beam around the source, while compensating for any coating of any laser optics inside the TLE chamber.

The gas in the chamber can be incorporated in the deposition film. With the addition of an oxygen or ozone atmosphere, oxide films can readily be grown with TLE at pressures up to 10^{−2} hPa. Similarly, the addition of an ammonia gas source, a wide variety of nitride films can be grown via TLE, including various superconducting nitride compounds like TiN and NbN.

== History ==
Shortly after the invention of the laser by Theodore Maiman in 1960, it was quickly recognized that a laser could act as a point source to evaporate source material in a vacuum chamber for fabricating thin films. In 1965, Smith and Turner succeeded in depositing thin films using a ruby laser, after which Groh deposited thin films using a continuous-wave CO_{2} laser in 1968. Further work demonstrated that laser-induced evaporation is an effective way to deposit dielectric and semiconductor films. However, issues occurred with regard to stoichiometry and the uniformity of the deposited films, thus diminishing their quality compared to films deposited by other techniques. Experiments to investigate the deposition of thin films using a pulsed laser at high power densities laid the foundation for pulsed laser deposition, an extremely successful growth technique that is widely used today.

Experiments utilizing continuous-wave lasers continued to be performed throughout the latter half of the twentieth century, highlighting the many advantages of continuous-wave laser evaporation including low power densities, which can reduce surface damage to sensitive films. It proved challenging to achieve congruent evaporation from compound sources using continuous-wave lasers, and film deposition was typically limited to sources with high vapor pressures due to the low continuous wave power densities available.

In 2019, the evaporation of sources using continuous-wave lasers was rediscovered at the Max Planck Institute for Solid State Research and dubbed "thermal laser epitaxy". This new technique uses elemental sources illuminated by high-power continuous-wave lasers (typically with peak powers around 1 kW at a wavelength of 1000 nm), thus allowing the deposition of low-vapor-pressure materials such as carbon and tungsten while avoiding issues with congruent evaporation from compound sources.
