= Vanadium nitride =

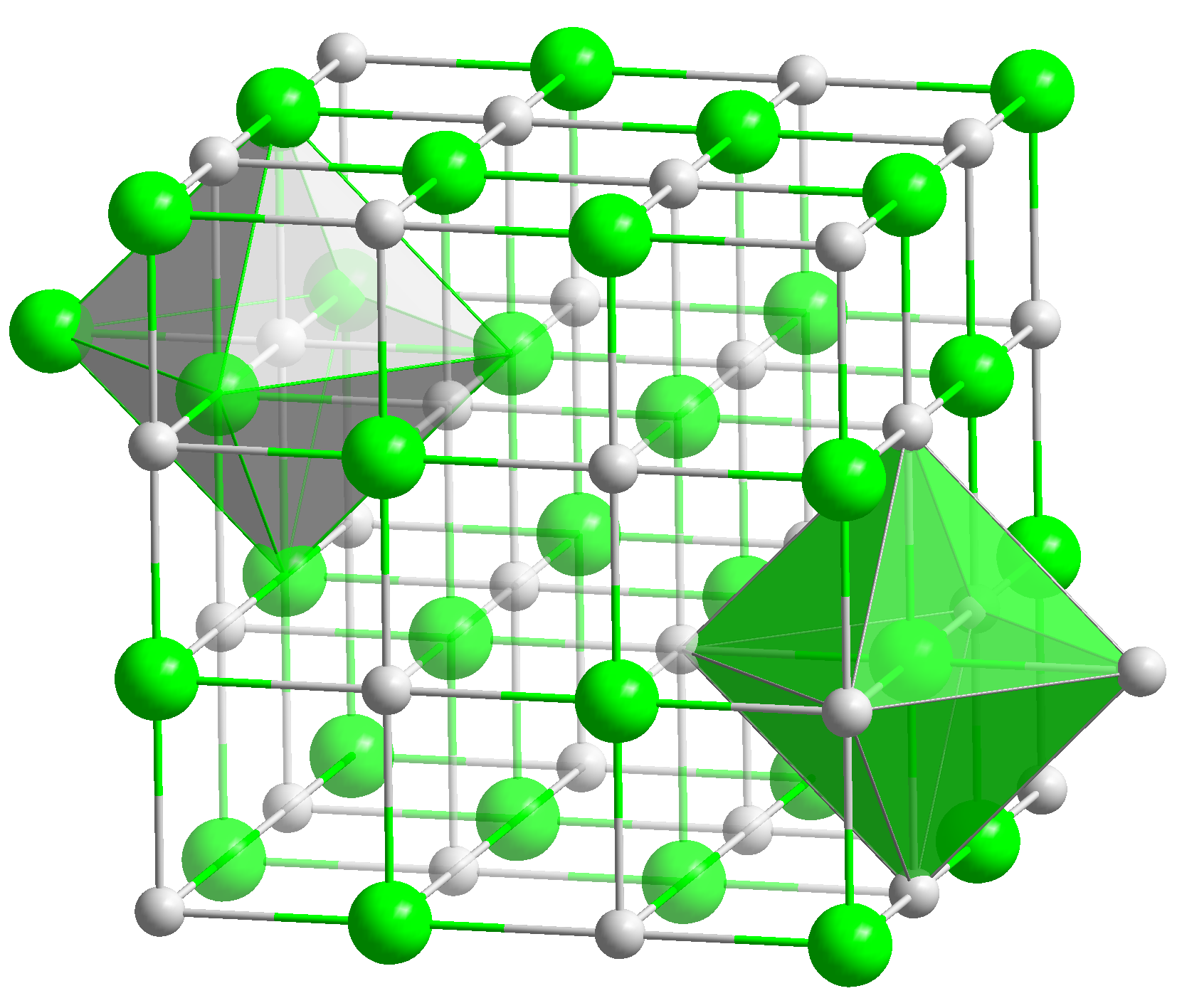

Names
- IUPAC name Vanadium nitride
- Other names Vanadium(III) nitride

Identifiers
CAS Number	24646-85-3
3D model (JSmol)	Interactive image
ChemSpider	81776
ECHA InfoCard	100.042.151
EC Number	246-382-4
PubChem CID	90570
- InChI: InChI=1S/N.V Key: SKKMWRVAJNPLFY-UHFFFAOYSA-N
- SMILES: N#[V]

Properties
Chemical formula	VN
Molar mass	64.9482 g/mol
Appearance	black powder
Density	6.13 g/cm^{3}
Melting point	2,050 °C (3,720 °F; 2,320 K)

Structure
Crystal structure	cubic, cF8
Space group	Fm3̅m, No. 225

Hazards
- GHS labelling
Pictograms	(GHS07: Exclamation mark)
Signal word	Warning
Hazard statements	H302, H312, H332
Precautionary statements	P261, P264, P270, P271, P280, P301+P312, P302+P352, P304+P312, P304+P340, P312, P322, P330, P363, P501
Flash point	Non-flammable

Related compounds
Other anions	vanadium(III) oxide, vanadium carbide
Other cations	titanium nitride, chromium(III) nitride, niobium nitride
- Except where otherwise noted, data are given for materials in their standard state (at 25 °C [77 °F], 100 kPa). verify (what is ?) Infobox references

Vanadium nitride, VN, is a chemical compound of vanadium and nitrogen.

Vanadium nitride is formed during the nitriding of steel and increases wear resistance. Another phase, V_{2}N, also referred to as vanadium nitride, can be formed along with VN during nitriding. VN has a cubic, rock-salt structure. There is also a low-temperature form, which contains V_{4} clusters. The low-temperature phase results from a dynamic instability, when the energy of vibrational modes in the high-temperature NaCl-structure phase, are reduced below zero.

It is a strong-coupled superconductor. Nanocrystalline vanadium nitride has been claimed to have potential for use in supercapacitors. The properties of vanadium nitride depend sensitively on the stoichiometry of the material.
