= Superconducting nanowire single-photon detector =

Type of single-photon detector

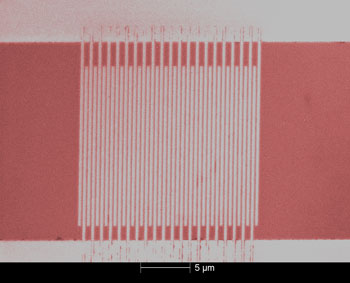
False-color scanning electron micrograph of a superconducting nanowire single-photon detector (SNSPD). Image credit: NIST.

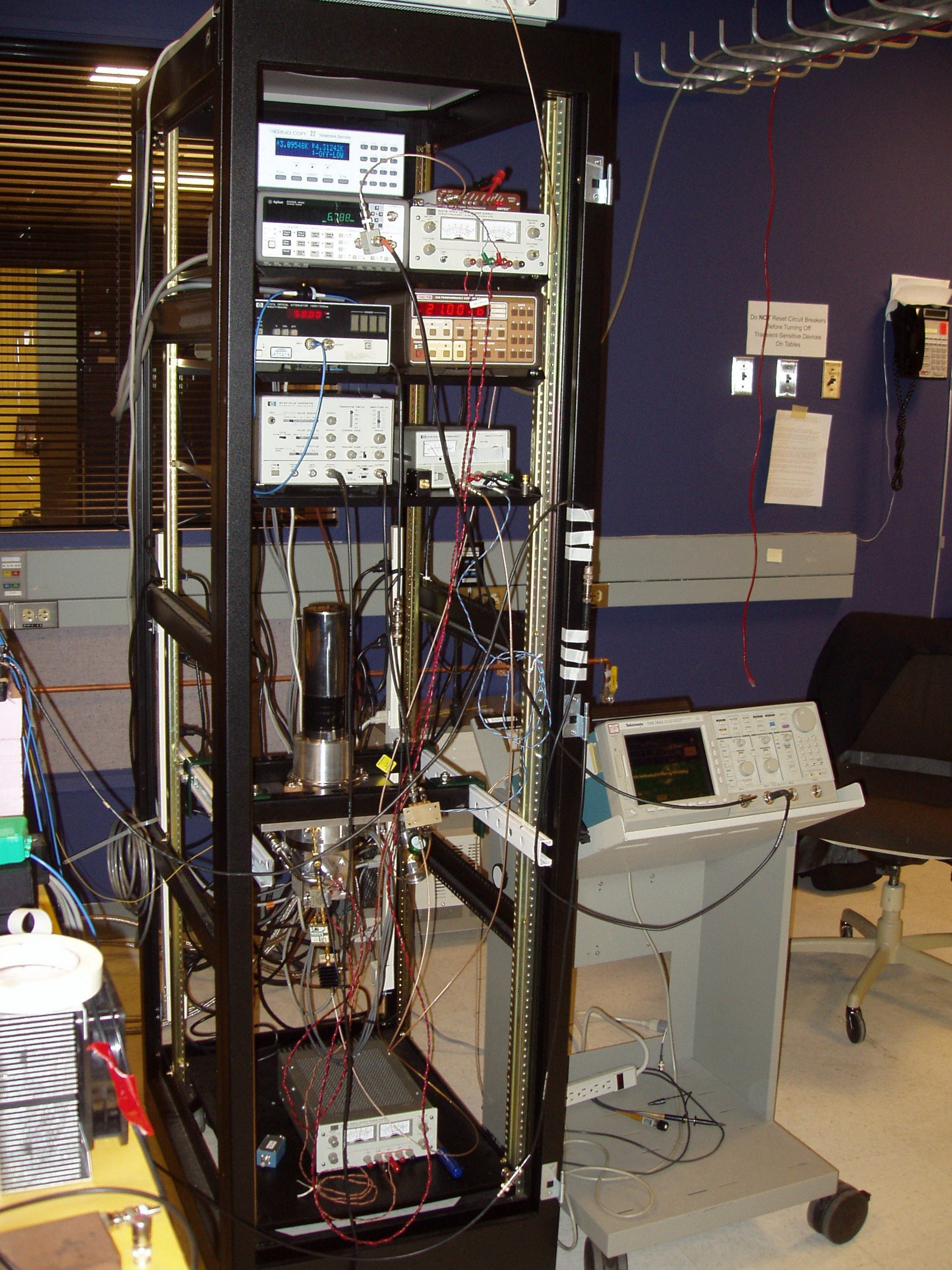
Superconducting nanowire single-photon detector in the DARPA Quantum Network laboratory at BBN, June 2005

The superconducting nanowire single-photon detector (SNSPD) is a type of optical and near-infrared single-photon detector based on a current-biased superconducting nanowire. It was first developed by scientists at Moscow State Pedagogical University and at the University of Rochester in 2001. The first fully operational prototype was demonstrated in 2005 by the National Institute of Standards and Technology (Boulder), and BBN Technologies as part of the DARPA Quantum Network.

As of 2026, a superconducting nanowire single-photon detector is the fastest single-photon detector (SPD) for photon counting. It is a key enabling technology for quantum optics and optical quantum technologies. SNSPDs are available with very high detection efficiency, very low dark count rate and very low timing jitter, compared to other types of single-photon detectors. SNSPDs are covered by International Electrotechnical Commission (IEC) international standards. As of 2017, commercial SNSPD devices are available in multichannel systems in a price range of $50,000 to $100,000.

It was recently discovered that superconducting wires as wide as 20 μm can detect single infra-red photons. This is important because optical lithography rather than electron lithography can be used in their construction. This reduces the cost for applications that require large photodetector areas.

== Principle of operation ==
The SNSPD consists of a thin (≈ 5 nm) and narrow (≈ 100 nm) superconducting nanowire. The length is typically hundreds of micrometers, and the nanowire is patterned in a compact meander geometry to create a square or circular pixel with high detection efficiency. The nanowire is cooled well below its superconducting critical temperature and biased with a DC current that is close to but less than the superconducting critical current of the nanowire. A photon incident on the nanowire breaks Cooper pairs and reduces the local critical current below that of the bias current. This results in the formation of a localized non-superconducting region, or hotspot, with finite electrical resistance. This resistance is typically larger than the 50 ohm input impedance of the readout amplifier, and hence most of the bias current is shunted to the amplifier. This produces a measurable voltage pulse that is approximately equal to the bias current multiplied by 50 ohms. With most of the bias current flowing through the amplifier, the non-superconducting region cools and returns to the superconducting state. The time for the current to return to the nanowire is typically set by the inductive time constant of the nanowire, equal to the kinetic inductance of the nanowire divided by the impedance of the readout circuit. Proper self-resetting of the device requires that this inductive time constant be slower than the intrinsic cooling time of the nanowire hotspot.

While the SNSPD does not match the intrinsic energy or photon-number resolution of the superconducting transition edge sensor, the SNSPD is significantly faster than conventional transition edge sensors and operates at higher temperatures. A degree of photon-number resolution can be achieved in SNSPD arrays, through time-binning or advanced readout schemes. Most SNSPDs are made of sputtered niobium nitride (NbN), which offers a relatively high superconducting critical temperature (≈ 10 K) which enables SNSPD operation in the temperature range 1 K to 4 K (compatible with liquid helium or modern closed-cycle cryocoolers). The intrinsic thermal time constants of NbN are short, giving very fast cooling time after photon absorption (<100 picoseconds).

The absorption in the superconducting nanowire can be boosted by a variety of strategies: integration with an optical cavity, integration with a photonic waveguide or addition of nanoantenna structures. SNSPD cavity devices in NbN, NbTiN, WSi & MoSi have demonstrated fibre-coupled device detection efficiencies greater than 98% at 1550 nm wavelength with count rates in the tens of MHz. The detection efficiencies are optimized for a specific wavelength range in each detector. They vary widely, however, due to highly localized regions of the nanowires where the effective cross-sectional area for superconducting current is reduced. SNSPD devices have also demonstrated exceptionally low jitter – the uncertainty in the photon arrival time – as low as 3 picoseconds at visible wavelengths. Timing jitter increases as photon energy drops and has been verified out to 3.5 micrometres wavelength. Timing jitter is an extremely important property for time-correlated single-photon counting (TCSPC) applications. Furthermore, SNSPDs have extremely low rates of dark counts, i.e. the occurrence of voltage pulses in the absence of a detected photon. In addition, the deadtime (time interval following a detection event during which the detector is not sensitive) is on the order of a few nanoseconds, this short deadtime translates into very high saturation count rates and enables antibunching measurements with a single detector.

For the detection of longer wavelength photons, however, the detection efficiency of standard SNSPDs decreases significantly. Recent efforts to improve the detection efficiency at near-infrared and mid-infrared wavelengths include studies of narrower (20 nm and 30 nm wide) NbN nanowires as well as extensive studies of alternative superconducting materials with lower superconducting critical temperatures than NbN (tungsten silicide, niobium silicide, molybdenum silicide and tantalum nitride). Single photon sensitivity up to 29 micrometers wavelength has recently been demonstrated in a tungsten silicide SNSPD. Alternative thin film deposition techniques such as atomic layer deposition are of interest for extending the spectral range and scalability of SNSPDs to large areas. High temperature superconductors have been investigated for SNSPDs with some encouraging recent reports. SNSPDs have been created from magnesium diboride with some single photon sensitivity in the visible and near infrared.

There is considerable interest and effort in scaling up SNSPDs to large multipixel arrays and cameras. A 400,000 pixel SNSPD array has recently been reported. A key challenge is readout, which can be addressed via multiplexing or digital readout using superconducting single flux quantum logic.

== Applications ==
Many of the initial application demonstrations of SNSPDs have been in the area of quantum information, such as quantum key distribution and optical quantum computing. Other current and emerging applications include imaging of infrared photoemission for defect analysis in CMOS circuitry, single photon emitter characterization, LIDAR, on-chip quantum optics, optical neuromorphic computing, fibre optic temperature sensing, optical time domain reflectometry, readout for ion trap qubits, quantum plasmonics, single electron detection, single α and β particle detection, singlet oxygen luminescence detection, deep space optical communication, dark matter searches and exoplanet detection. A number of companies worldwide are successfully commercializing complete single-photon detection systems based on superconducting nanowires, including Munich Quantum Instruments, Single Quantum, Photon Spot, Scontel, Quantum Opus, ID Quantique, PhoTec and Pixel Photonics. Wider adoption of SNSPD technology is closely linked to advances in cryocoolers for 4 K and below, and SNSPDs have recently been demonstrated in miniaturized systems.
