= Helena Waldmann =

German choreographer and theater director

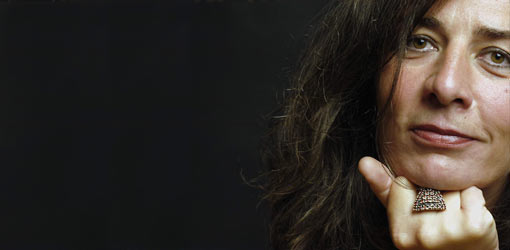
- Born: 1962 (age 63–64); Burghausen, West Germany
- Known for: Choreographer, Theatre director

Helena Waldmann (born 1962 in Burghausen) is a German choreographer and theater director.

== Education ==
Helena Waldmann studied Applied Theatre Studies at the Justus Liebig University in Gießen with Andrzej Wirth and Hans-Thies Lehmann from 1982 to 1987, graduating with a diploma in theatre studies. During her studies she worked with Heiner Müller, George Tabori, Adolf Dresen, Emma Lewis Thomas and Molly Davies, among others.

== Career ==
From 1993 to 1999 she lived in Frankfurt/Main, where she staged various multimedia dance productions at the Künstlerhaus Mousonturm in which the focus was on playing with the viewer's gaze. These early pieces are optical confusion games between reality, illusion and virtuality.

In 2000 she received a call from Berlin. She directs for 'Berlin Offene Stadt'/ Berliner Festspiele and is artist in residence at Podewil.

In 2003 she received the UNESCO prize for the production Headhunters choreographed with Brazilian dancers in Salvador de Bahia.

The political force of her choreographies, which tour worldwide, is unmistakable in her "Letters from Tentland", produced in Tehran for six Iranian women, as well as in her short film "emotional rescue", shot with a dance company in Palestine, in her responses to European asylum policy formulated by Iranian exiles in "return to sender", and in "feierabend! - the antidote", a celebration against the modern dictatorship of labour. In "BurkaBondage" she relates the Islamic veil and Japanese bondage. In "get a revolver" she shows the socially outlawed role of dementia. In "Made in Bangladesh", she addresses the frenzied and exploitative labour conditions of the present, in "Good Passports Bad Passports", she examines the prestige of the passport in terms of the freedom of movement it guarantees or takes away, in "We Love Horses", she looks at the dressage of humans by politics. In "The Intruder" she draws analogies between body/virus and politics.

== Further activities ==
In the winter semester 2018/19 she is Bertolt Brecht Visiting Professor at the Centre of Competence for Theatre at the University of Leipzig's Department of Theatre Studies. In the winter semesters 2004/05 and 1994/95 she held teaching positions at the Institute for Theatre, Film and Media Studies at the University of Frankfurt/Main and in the summer semester 1995/96 at the Institut d'Etudes Théâtrales de la Université Paris 8, Saint-Denis, Paris. Since 2018 she is juror for the German Dance Award.

== Main choreographies ==
- Cloakroom Encounters – a dance film (2020) Tanztheater Wuppertal |Pina Bausch
- The Intruder (2019) Theater im Pfalzbau Ludwigshafen
- We Love Horses (2018) Theaterhaus Stuttgart
- Good Passports Bad Passports (2017) Theater im Pfalzbau Ludwigshafen
- Made in Bangladesh (2014) Theater im Pfalzbau Ludwigshafen
- HappyPiece (2011) Radialsystem V Berlin
- Get a revolver(2010 ) Radialsystem V Berlin
- BurkaBondage (2009) Berliner Festspiele
- Feierabend! - the antidote (2008) Sophiensaele Berlin
- Return to Sender (2006) Montpellier Dance Festival
- Emotional Rescue - dance film made in Palestine (2005)
- Letters from Tentland (2005) Haus der Kunst München/ Fadjr Festival Tehran
- Headhunters - cutting the edges (2005) Teatro Villa Velha, Salvador de Bahia [BR]
- wash cut blow-dry (2003) Luzerner Theater [CH]
- The Invasion of the Penguins (2002) Staatstheater Darmstadt [D]
- Odyssee 2002 (2002) Luzerner Theater [CH]
- China on the Catwalk (2001) China-Feast, Beijing/Berlin
- Banquet for Long Pigs (2001) Podewil Berlin [D]
- Show window, Atelier Markgraph, YelloMiles Multimedia Show (2001)
- The Expansion of the Fighting Zone(2001) Luzerner Theater [CH]
- See and be scene (2000) Haus der Deutschen Wirtschaft, Berliner Festspiele Berlin [D]
- CheshireCat® (1999 ) Künstlerhaus Mousonturm Frankfurt/Main [D]
- lucky Johnny(1998) Künstlerhaus Mousonturm Frankfurt/Main [D]
- Vodka konkav(1997) Künstlerhaus Mousonturm Frankfurt/Main [D]
- Face....à (1996) Künstlerhaus Mousonturm Frankfurt/Main [D]
- Circuit (1995) Künstlerhaus Mousonturm Frankfurt/Main [D]
- The malady of death (1993) Künstlerhaus Mousonturm Frankfurt/Main [D]
- Ungeduscht, geduzt und ausgebuht (1992) Schauspielhaus Bochum [D]
- In der Einsamkeit der Baumwollfelder (1991) Schauspielhaus Bochum [D]
- Verkürzte Landschaft (1990) Schauspielhaus Bochum [D]

== Prizes and awards ==
- Impulse Prize for "vodka vonkav" (1997)
- EVA award for "Show-window" (2001)
- UNESCO Prize for "Headhunters" (2003)
- Infant Price (Serbia) for "Return to Sender"(2006)
- Made in Bangladesh nominated for the German stage award DER FAUST 2015
- Invitation to the Dance Platform Germany Frankfurt/Main 1995 | 1999 Hamburg | 2006 Stuttgart | 2012 Dresden

== Literature ==
- Hans-Thies Lehmann: Post-Dramatic Theatre, Verlag der Autoren, Frankfurt/Main 1999
- Susan Vincent (ed.): Letters from Tentland, transcript Verlag Bielefeld 2005
- Arnd Wesemann: Immer Feste tanzen, transcript Verlag Bielefeld 2008
- Natasha Hassiotis, Great Choreographers - Interviews, AuthorHouse, 2014
- Claudia Rosiny, Intermediale Beziehungen zwischen Mediengeschichte und moderner Tanzästhetik, transcript Verlag, 2013
- Arnd Wesemann: "Made in Bangladesh." Editie Leesmagazijn, Amsterdam 2014
