= Burghausen, Altötting =

Burghausen
- Town
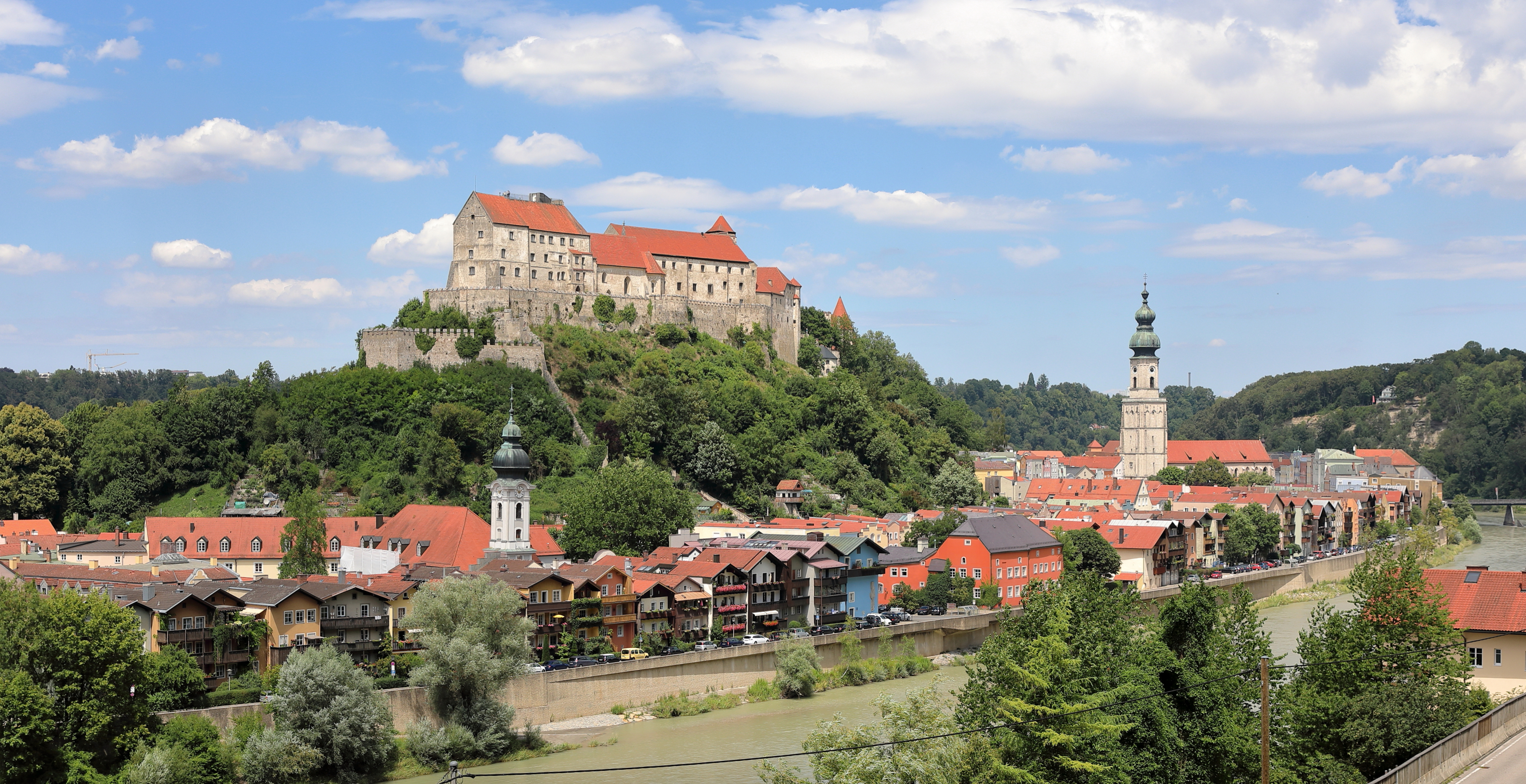
- View of the city

- Coat of arms

- Location of Burghausen within Altötting district
- Interactive map of Burghausen
- Location within Germany Location within Bavaria
- Coordinates: 48°10′N 12°50′E
- Country: Germany
- State: Bavaria
- Admin. region: Oberbayern
- District: Altötting
- Subdivisions: 33 Ortsteile

Government
  - Mayor (2020–26): Florian Schneider (SPD)

Area
  - Total: 19.81 km^{2} (7.65 sq mi)
- Elevation: 421 m (1,381 ft)

Population (2025-12-31)
  - Total: 19,381
  - Density: 978.3/km^{2} (2,534/sq mi)
- Time zone: UTC+01:00 (CET)
  - Summer (DST): UTC+02:00 (CEST)
- Postal codes: 84489 8263
- Dialling codes: 08677
- Vehicle registration: AÖ
- Website: www.burghausen.de

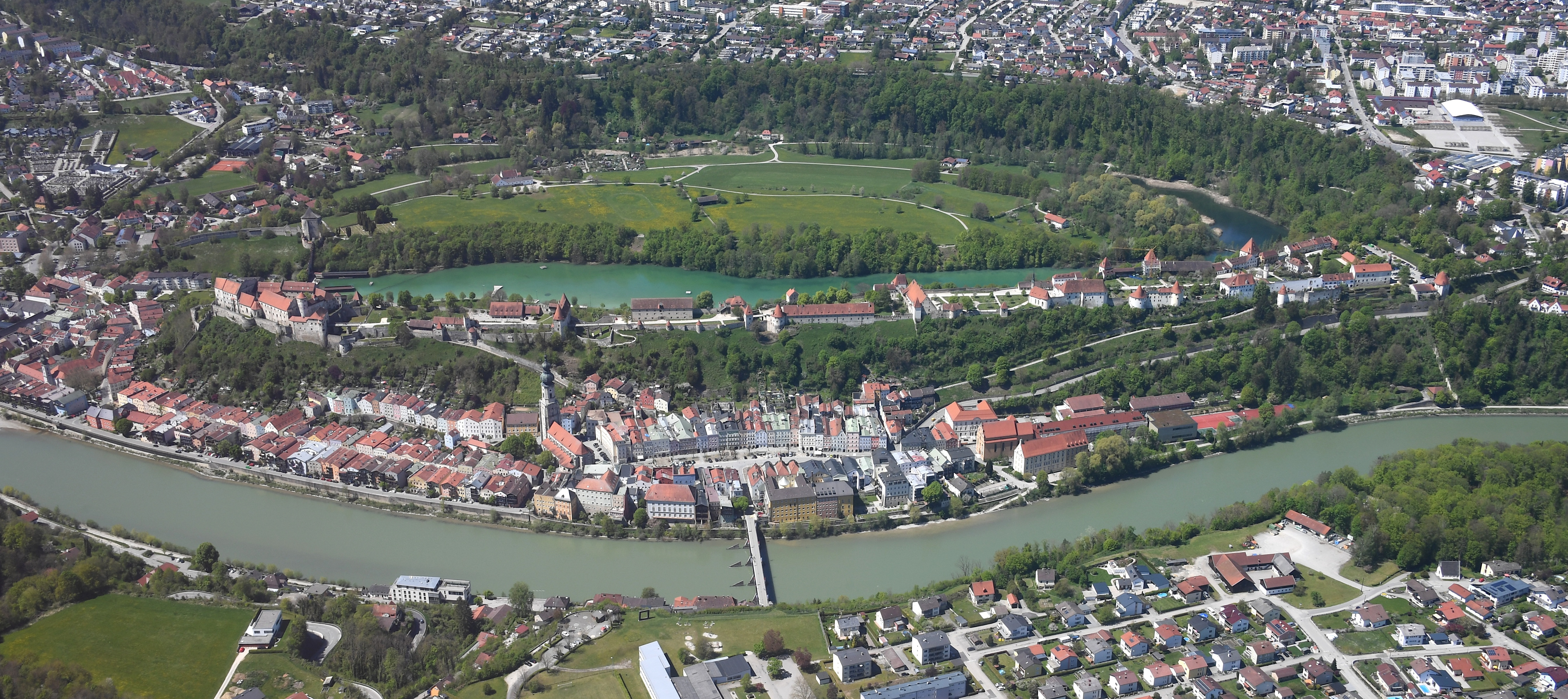
Aerial image of Burghausen and the Burghausen Castle

Burghausen (German pronunciation: [bʊʁkˈhaʊzn̩]) is the largest town in the Altötting district of Upper Bavaria in Germany. It is situated on the Salzach river, near the border with Austria. Burghausen Castle rests along a ridgeline, and is the longest castle in the world (1,051 m).

== History ==
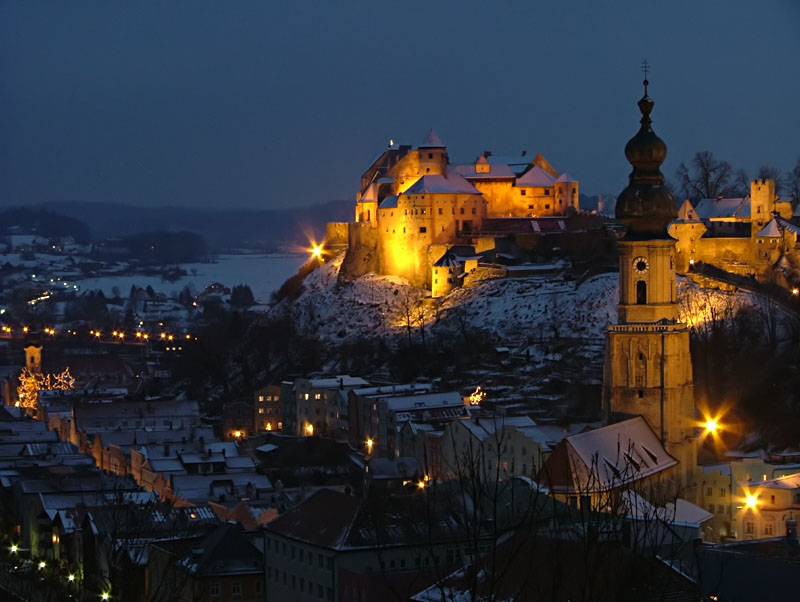
Panoramic view at night

The oldest mention of Burghausen is documented in the year 1025 as Imperial real property. Emperor Conrad II would later appoint the Counts of Burghausen as the financial administrators of the locality. But, as latest excavations have shown, the area around the main court of Burghausen's castle has at least been inhabited since the Bronze Age. With Archaeologists finding artifacts of the pre-metal Celtic, Iron Age, and Roman era, it is hard to pinpoint a "founding" date. The town has developed over thousands of years, but it is not yet possible to say how long there has been a permanent settlement.

In 1164, Duke Henry the Lion took possession of the castle. The Wittelsbachs took possession of the castle in 1180 and the surrounding valley settlements in 1229. The conferral of town status was presumed at some point, but is not supported by sources. Starting in 1255, after the first division of Bavaria, Burghausen gained political and economic prominence as the second residence of the Lower Bavarian dukes.

Burghausen's main source of income was the trade in salt from Hallein, (modern-day Austria). The salt was brought ashore in Burghausen and transported further overland. The landing spot was at the Mautner castle, which now houses the city's education and cultural centre.

In 1307, the pre-existing local law was codified as municipal law, and in the first half of the 14th century, Emperor Louis IV granted the town further important privileges. By the end of the 14th century, Burghausen had become an administrative center as the site of the area's revenue office.

Under the last three Lower Bavarian dukes, Henry XVI the Rich (1393–1450), Louis IX the Rich (1450–1479) and George the Rich, (1479–1503), Burghausen experienced an expansion and golden age as the second capital of the duchy Bavaria-Landshut. In 1505, after the Landshut War of Succession, Burghausen was one of the four Stewardships in reorganized Bavaria.

The income from the salt trade was lost in 1594 because of the establishment of the ducal salt monopoly.

Following this, Burghausen experienced more than 300 years of administrative and commercial decline:

- Heavy casualties and losses in the Thirty Years' War (1618–48), the War of the Spanish Succession (1701–14) and the War of the Bavarian Succession (1778–79).
- The transfer of the Innviertel in the Treaty of Teschen at the end of the War of the Bavarian Succession, and the consequent loss of business from the border region.
- The crisis caused by the French Revolutionary Wars and dissolution of government in 1802.
- In 1807, the loss of the title of "capital" which had been granted in 1688.
- The establishment of river shipping and the loss of the garrison in 1891.

By the end of the 19th century and beginning of the 20th, Burghausen had become an impoverished provincial town with barely 2,500 inhabitants. However, an economic upturn began in 1915 with the establishment of Wacker Chemie.

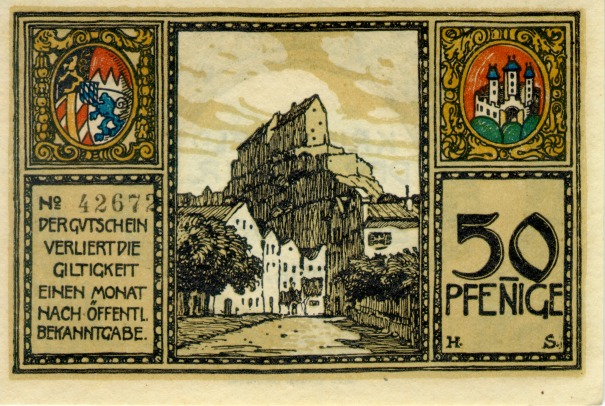
Notgeld issued by the city Burghausen in 1918

- The new city has developed alongside the old town, with a coherence of design, reorganization and increased security from the construction of the flood control dam and the Uferstraße from 1969-71.
- Expansion of Wacker Chemie In 1966, the then Deutsche Marathon built a refinery (now OMV).
- The population has increased from 2,500 in 1910 and 5,000 in 1946 to 19,000 (2005).
- In 1995, the Athanor Academy of Performing Arts opened in the middle of the Castle. In 2014, it was relocated to Passau.
- Burghausen gained regional fame through the SV Wacker Burghausen Soccer Sports Association and the annual Internationale Jazzwoche Burghausen.
- In 2004, the National Horticultural Show received approximately one million visitors.
- In the winter of 2005-2006, the town gave Christmas benefits to all of its unemployment benefit recipients, gaining nationwide attention in all news media, including the Bild tabloid newspaper.

== Main sights ==
The main sight of Burghausen besides Burghausen Castle is the picturesque Old Town in southern Inn-Salzach style. The parish church St. Jakob was consecrated in 1140, reconstructed after a fire in 1353 but the dome of the spire was created only in 1778/81. The ancient Regierungsgebäude (former Government Building) was built in the 16th century with three decorative Renaissance-turrets. The Townhall with its Neo-classical facade originates already from the 14th and 15th century. These buildings are all situated at Burghausen's grand central square Stadtplatz, same as the baroque Guardian Angel Church. To the north of this square is the former Jesuit church St.Joseph (1630/31), to the south the Holy Spirit Church (1325/30) which was altered during the Baroque. Above the Old Town sprawls the gothic Burghausen Castle with a branch gallery of the Bavarian State Painting Collections and the Burghausen City Museum. The Wöhrsee lake is located between the Old Town and the castle. The baroque pilgrimage church St. Maria Himmelfahrt is situated in Marienberg a little distance to the southwest of Burghausen, not far away from the baroque church of the ancient Raitenhaslach Abbey. The city's education and cultural centre hosts adult education classes in photography and jazz as well as crafts and jazz events.

=== Images of the castle ===
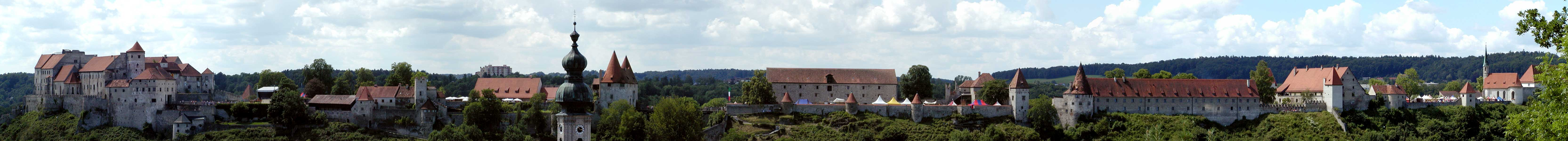
Panoramic view of the castle (view from east)

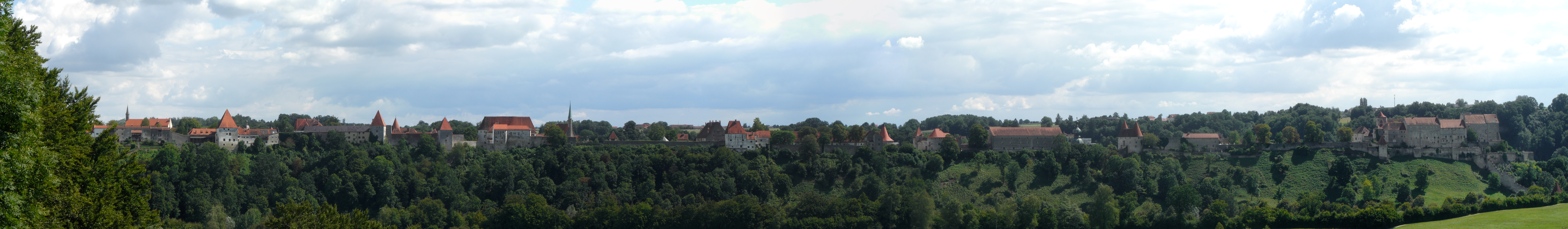
Panoramic view of the castle (view from west)

== Born in Burghausen ==
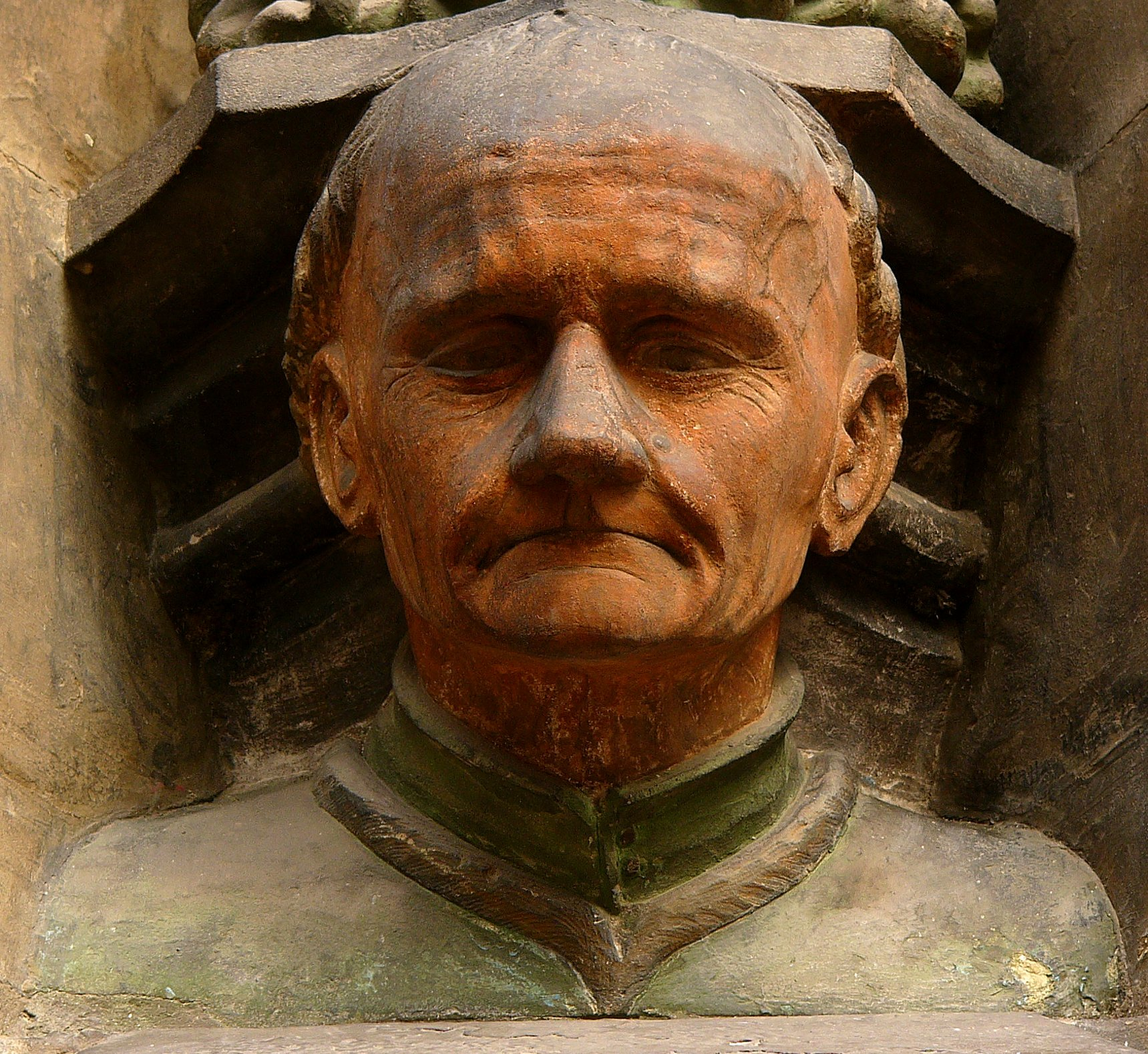
Hans von Burghausen

- Hans Stethaimer (~ 1360–1432), architect and painter
- Max Doerner (1870–1939), painter, restorer, art theorist
- Hannelore Elsner (1942–2019), actress
- Günther Heydemann (born 1950), historian
- Helena Waldmann (born 1962), director and choreographer
- Fritz Kreutzpointner (born 1967), racing driver
- Michael Wiesinger (born 1972), football player
- Dominik Rohracker (born 1989), football player
- Kerstin Spielberger (born 1995), ice hockey player
- Thomas Augustin (1965–2026), German statistician

== Sources ==
Hoppe, Stephan. “Translating the Past: Local Romanesque Architecture in Germany and Its Fifteenth-Century Reinterpretation.” The Quest for an Appropriate Past in Literature, Art and Architecture, edited by Karl A.E. Enenkel and Konrad A. Ottenheym, vol. 60, Brill, LEIDEN; BOSTON, 2019, pp. 511–585. JSTOR, www.jstor.org/stable/10.1163/j.ctvbqs5nk.26. Accessed 18 Mar. 2021.
