= Wacker Chemie =

German chemical company

Wacker Chemie AG
- Traded as: FWB: WCH; MDAX
- ISIN: DE000WCH8881
- Industry: Chemicals
- Founded: 1914
- Founder: Alexander Wacker
- Headquarters: Munich, Germany
- Key people: Dr. Christian Hartel (CEO and chairman of the executive board), Peter-Alexander Wacker (Chairman of the supervisory board), Paul Lindblad (president of Wacker Greater China)
- Products: Silicon for the semiconductor industry, silane, silicones, polymers, polycrystalline silicon, fine chemicals, biotechnology
- Revenue: €6,207.5 million (2021)
- Operating income: €1,134.3 million (2021)
- Net income: €827.8 million (2021)
- Total assets: €8,134.3 million (end 2021)
- Total equity: €3,100.4 million (end 2021)
- Number of employees: 14,406 (end 2021)
- Website: wacker.com

Wacker Chemie AG is a German multinational chemical company which was founded in 1914 by Alexander Wacker. The company is controlled by the Wacker family holding more than 50 percent of the shares. The corporation operates more than 25 production sites in Europe, Asia, and the Americas.

The product range includes silicone rubbers, polymer products like ethylene vinyl acetate redispersible polymer powder, chemical materials, polysilicon and wafers for the semiconductor industry. The company sells its products in more than 100 countries. As of 31 December 2015, 16,972 employees have been with Wacker. Corporate annual sales in 2015, were about 5,3 billion Euros, up 10% compared to 2014.

== History ==
On 13 October 1914, Alexander Wacker established "Dr. Alexander Wacker, Gesellschaft für elektrochemische Industrie KG". The production plant in Burghausen, Upper Bavaria was constructed in 1916 and in December that year the first acetylaldehyde and acetic acid products were manufactured. The company began producing acetone products in the middle of the first World War and became a crucial producer for synthetic rubber at that time. In 1922, the first shellac was produced at the Burghausen facility. Wacker died in April that year at the age of 75.

Willy O. Hermann started the Wacker Polymers business division in 1920. In 1928 it began producing vinyl acetate and polyvinyl acetate. The PVC manufacturing process was developed in 1935 by Herbert Berg, which was sold in 2000. Silicones at Wacker began to be produced in 1947 and silane production came later in 1949.

In April 1953, Wacker became a limited liability private company and was renamed to Wacker-Chemie GmbH. Eduard Enk started the Wacker semiconductor business in 1953 and produced its first silicon rod two years later. In 1960, a new facility was built in Cologne for the 2nd Wacker process.

In 1978, Wacker Siltronic Corporation was founded in Portland, Oregon and in 1983 expansion of the company began in Asia with the addition of facilities there. In 1987, a wholly owned subsidiary of Wacker Chemie AG, DRAWIN Vertriebs GmbH was founded in Ottobrunn, Upper Bavaria.

Wacker began producing bioengineered products in 1990, which led to multiple acquisitions and the establishment of Wacker Biotech GmbH in 2005.

On 10 April 2006, Wacker shares were traded for the first time on the Frankfurt Stock Exchange.

Wacker celebrated its 100th anniversary in Munich 2014 and in 2015, Siltronic AG made its IPO.

== Business activity ==
Wacker Chemie AG – divided into 5 divisions – derives most of its products from two main raw materials: silicon and ethylene. Siltronic supplies the semi-conductor market with wafers.

Wacker Polysilicon produces hyper-pure electronic-grade polysilicon for use in electronic and solar wafers. Wacker Silicones serves end markets like construction, automobile, paints, textiles, and paper.

Wacker Polymers starting with ethylene serves mainly the construction industry with redispersible powders and several other industries with dispersions. Wacker Biosolutions focuses on using bio-technological processes to serve its customers. Wacker Polymers, a division of Wacker Chemie AG has appointed Peter Summo (48) as its next president, effective 1 October. Summo previously headed the engineering silicones business unit at Wacker Silicones. He is succeeding Arno von der Eltz, who is retiring on this date.

== Wacker Chemie in the United States ==
=== Tennessee polysilicon operations ===
In early 2009, Wacker announced plans to construct a new solar-grade polysilicon production facility in Charleston, a small city in Bradley County, Tennessee. Groundbreaking occurred on April 8, 2011, and the plant became operational in April 2016, costing approximately US$2.5 billion and making it the largest-ever single private investment in the state of Tennessee. In June 2017, a US$150 million secondary expansion was announced that would allow the plant to manufacture pyrogenic silica. This expansion was completed in October 2019, adding 50 new jobs to the plant.

==== Safety issues and incidents ====
- In October 2012, two subcontract workers fell to their death resulting in a temporary suspension of construction activities. The subcontracting company was later found to be at fault.
- A Tennessee Occupational and Safety Administration (TOSHA) inspection conducted in March 2016 resulted in a fine of US$3,500 for regulatory violations over the control of hazardous energy.
- A second TOSHA inspection conducted in August 2016, resulted in a fine of US$4,000 for issues stemming from process safety and respiratory equipment.
- On August 30, 2017, 5 workers were hospitalized with chemical burns following a discharge of Silane gas within the plant.
- On November 13, 2020, at approximately 10:15 am, five workers were injured in an incident described as an "industrial accident" involving a small release of hydrochloric acid and steam. One of the workers died from his injuries later that day.

==== 2017 explosion and aftermath ====
On September 7, 2017, a massive explosion in the plant's hydrogen recovery unit resulted in the release of a steam cloud which could be seen for several miles, as well as the environmental release of low-concentration hydrochloric acid. Due to initial concerns about the composition of the cloud, local officials closed a section of I-75 between nearby Cleveland and Calhoun, as well as nearby State Route 308 in Charleston. During the event, seven local residents, and a plant worker were transported to a local hospital with unspecified injuries. A firefighter and four sheriff's deputies were also treated for heat-related symptoms and later released. The following day, officials from TOSHA announced a temporary shutdown of the plant pending investigation. Five days later, an environmental sensor detected elevated levels of an unnamed substance prompting a shelter-in-place order for emergency workers involved in cleanup efforts within the facility.

During the explosion event, local officials instructed residents to shelter indoors with their windows closed and HVAC systems turned off. Nearby residents complained of respiratory distress, as well as an odd taste in their mouths. This led to speculation in both local and social media that the cloud contained high-concentration hydrochloric acid, despite media reports to the contrary. For the week following the event, there was little-to-no communication from Wacker management or government officials, resulting in further speculation about hazardous chemicals being released into the environment. Wacker management later issued a full-page letter stating that no hazardous chemicals were released. One and a half weeks later, Bradley County Emergency Management Agency Director Troy Spence held a press-conference attempting to allay fears, and urging residents to sign up for the county's non-emergency text-messaging service.

=== Plastics manufacturing ===
At the end of 2007, Wacker took over vinyl acetate/ethylene operations from Air Products Polymers. Consequently, it took full ownership of the activities in Allentown, Pennsylvania, and Calvert City, Kentucky.

== Locations ==
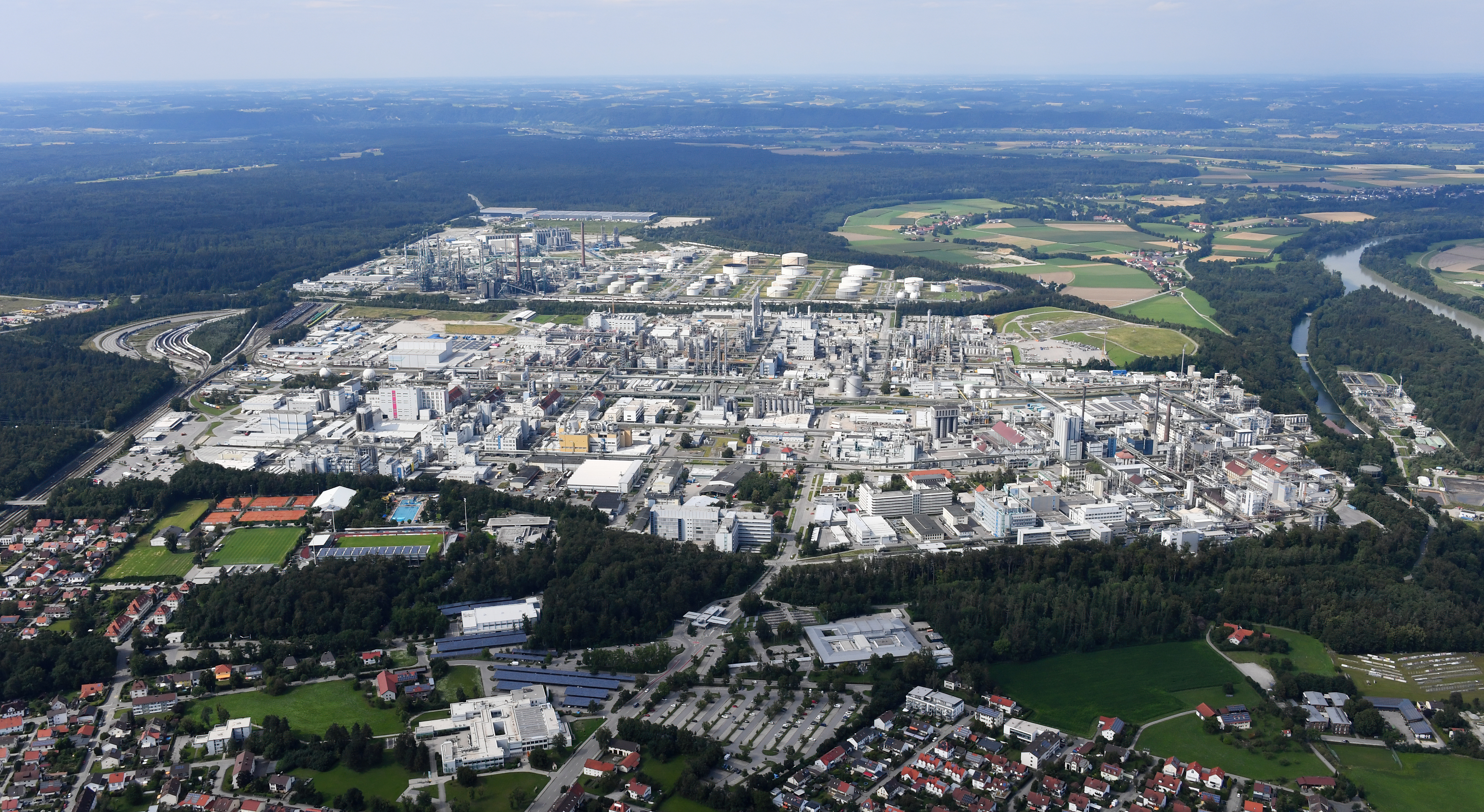
Wacker Chemie plant in Burghausen, Germany

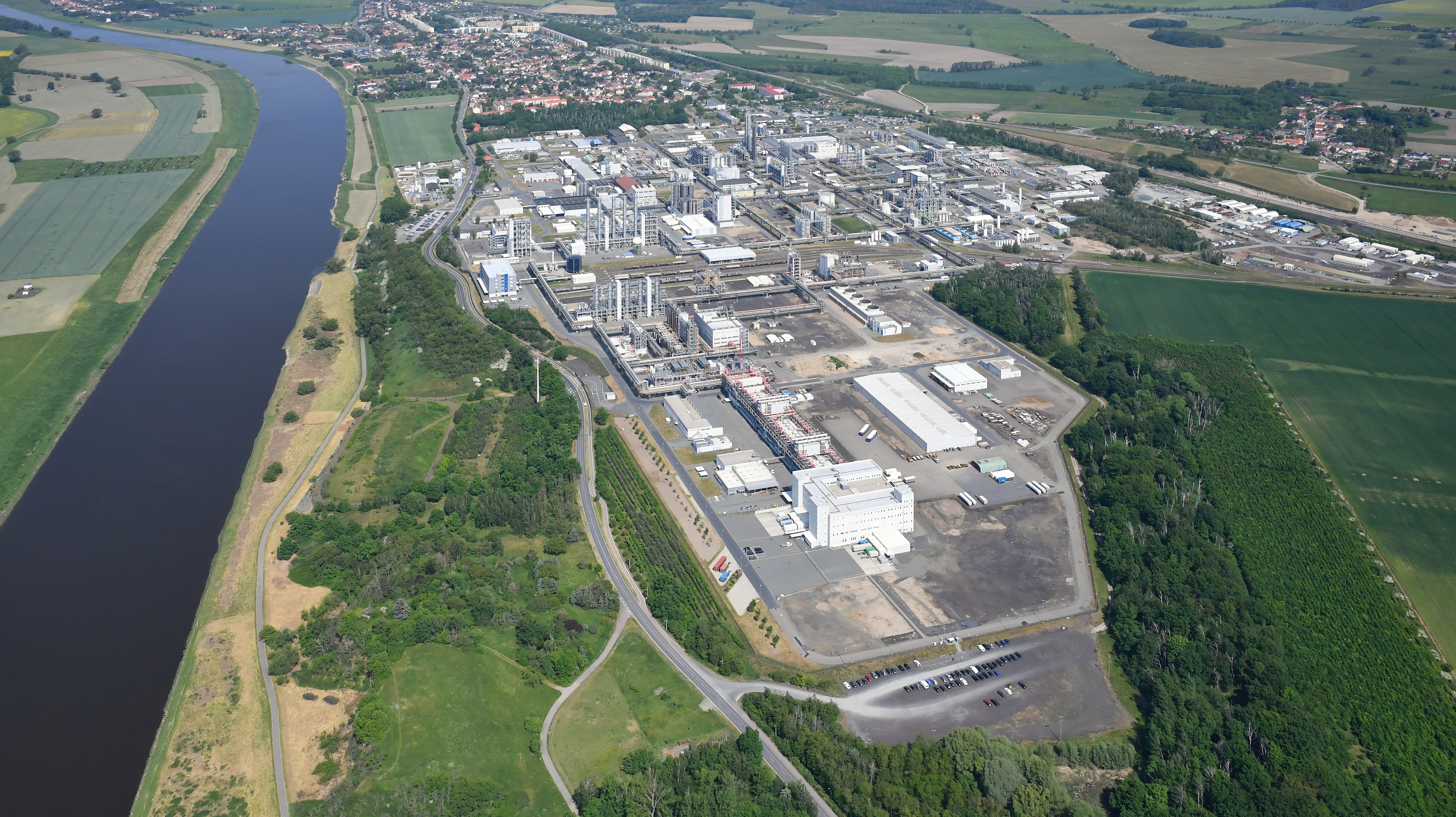
Wacker Chemie plant in Nünchritz, Germany

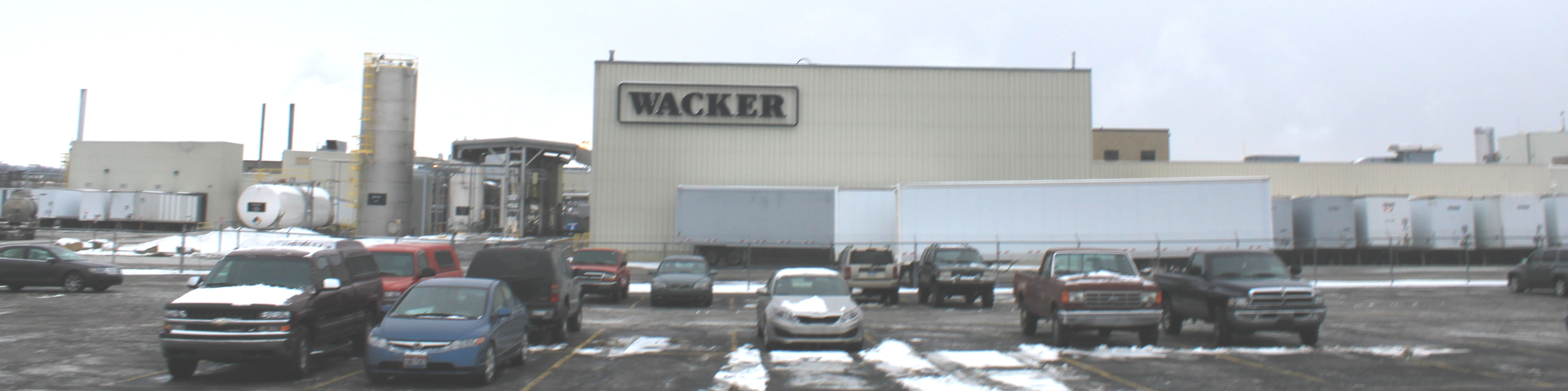
Wacker US headquarters, Adrian, Michigan

The biggest production site of Wacker Chemie is the Burghausen plant in the south-east of Bavaria, Germany, with about 8,000 employees. The US headquarters was previously located in Adrian, Michigan. In 2022, Wacker opened a new US headquarters in Ann Arbor, Michigan, with production sites in the Americas, Europe, and Asia.

Europe

- Burghausen, Cologne, Halle, Jena, Nünchritz, Stetten (Germany)
- Holla (Norway)
- León (Spain)
- Plzeň (Czech Republic)
- Amsterdam (Netherlands)

The Americas

- Adrian (Michigan)
- Calvert City (Kentucky)
- Charleston (Tennessee)
- Chino, San Diego (California)
- Eddyville (Iowa)
- Jandira (Brazil)
- North Canton (Ohio)

Asia

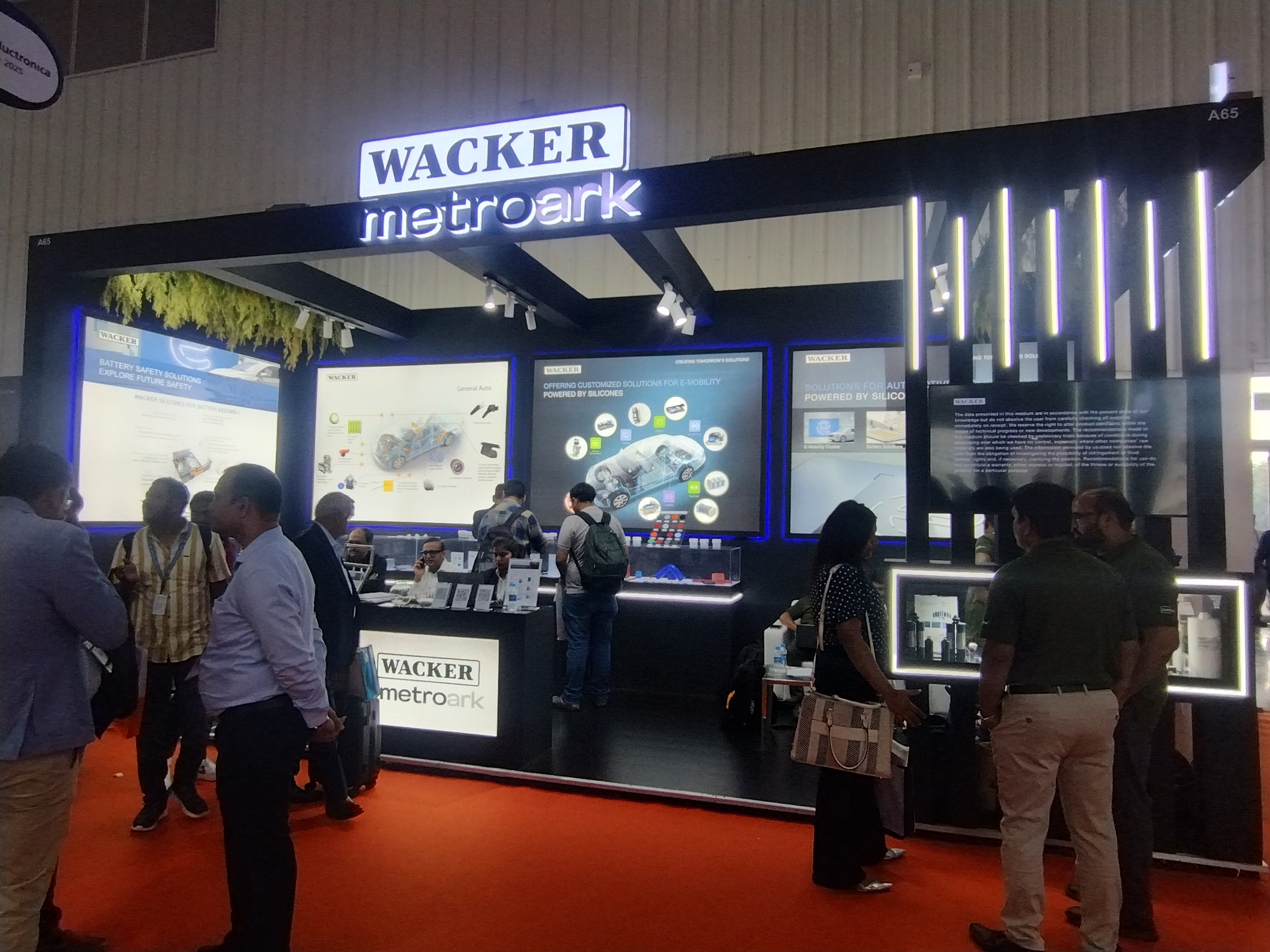
Wacker Metroark at Electronica 2025, BIEC

- Jincheon, Ulsan (South Korea)
- Kolkata, Panagarh (India)
- Jining, Nanjing, Shunde, Zhangjiagang (China)
- Tsukuba (Japan)

== Awards ==
In 2020 Wacker won an Adhesives and Sealants Council (ASC) Innovation Award for "GENIOSIL XB 502 Silane-Modified Polymers for High-Performance Adhesives for use with strong bonding adhesives."
