= Boston University Photonics Center =

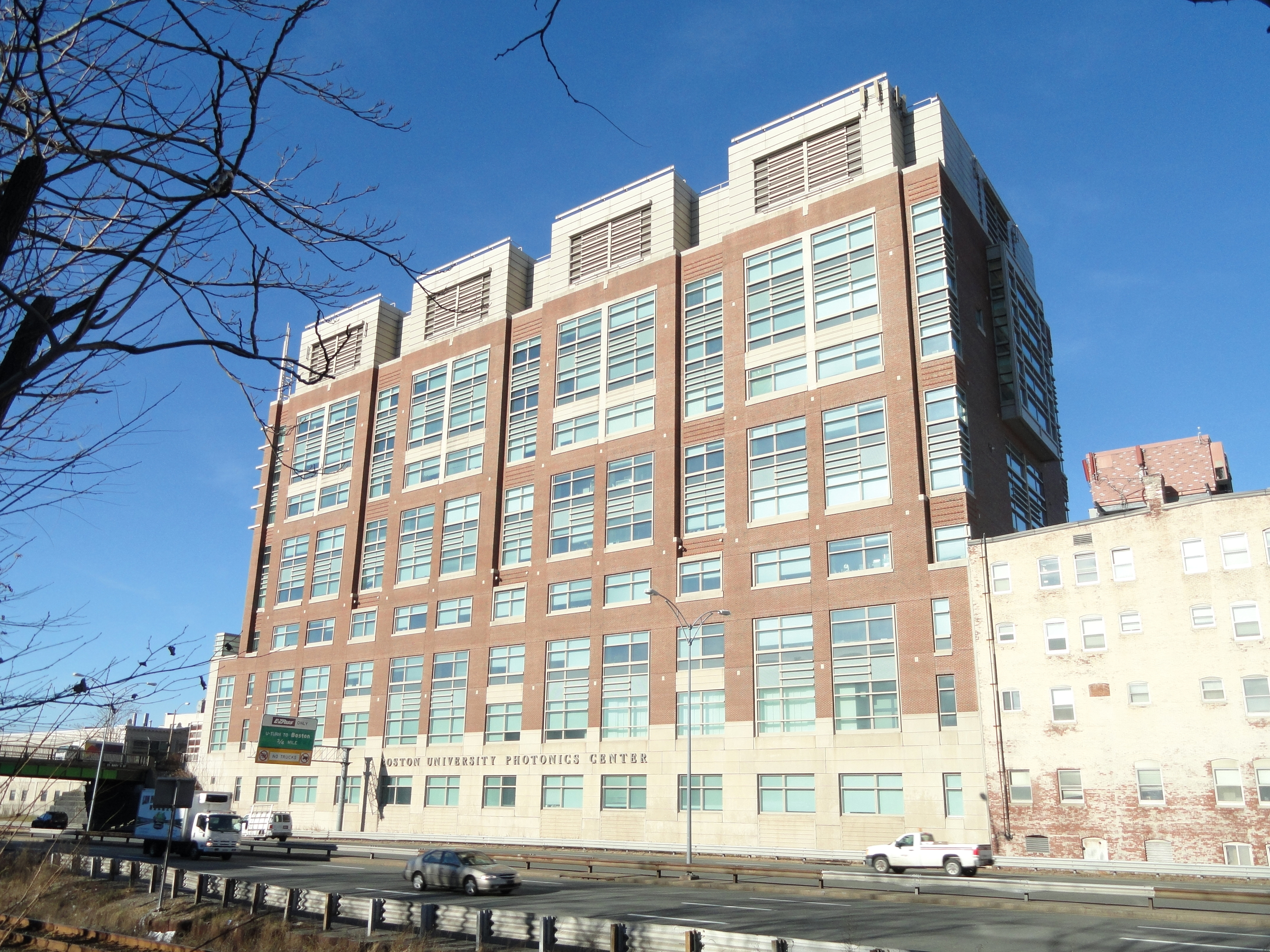
Boston University Photonics Center in 2012

The Boston University Photonics Center (BUPC) is a building and research center owned by Boston University. The 10-floor 235,000 sq ft (21,800 m^{2}) building opened in June 1997, finished at a cost of $78.4 million. The center specializes in developing and commercializing new products for the photonics industry, spanning the fields of biomedical engineering, nanoscience, physics, astronomy, and chemistry. The two lowest floors include classroom and lab spaces used by the College of Engineering; a number of engineering faculty also have their offices and research labs in the building.

The Photonics Center is located adjacent to the 8-lane Mass Pike and the busy Framingham/Worcester commuter rail line, which create noise and vibration that unmitigated would be disruptive to lectures and experiments. The steel frame of the building is founded on a reinforced concrete mat to minimize vibrations, while the above ground windows have a 1-inch airspace between window panes to block ambient sound from the highway.
