= Boride =

Class of chemical compounds

A boride is a compound between boron and a less electronegative element, for example silicon boride (SiB_{3} and SiB_{6}). The borides are a large group of compounds that generally offer high melting points and are more covalent than ionic. Some borides exhibit useful physical properties. The term boride is also loosely applied to compounds such as B_{12}As_{2} (N.B. arsenic has an electronegativity higher than boron) that is often referred to as icosahedral boride.

== Compounds ==
The borides can be classified loosely as boron rich or metal rich, for example the compound YB_{66} at one extreme through to Nd_{2}Fe_{14}B at the other. The generally accepted definition is that if the ratio of boron atoms to metal atoms is 4:1 or more, the compound is boron rich; if it is less, then it is metal rich.

=== Boron rich borides (B:M 4:1 or more) ===
The main group metals, lanthanides and actinides form a wide variety of boron-rich borides, with metal:boron ratios up to YB_{66}.

The properties of this group vary from one compound to the next, and include examples of compounds that are semi conductors, superconductors, diamagnetic, paramagnetic, ferromagnetic or anti-ferromagnetic. They are mostly stable and refractory.

Some metallic dodecaborides contain boron icosahedra, others (for example yttrium, zirconium and uranium) have the boron atoms arranged in cuboctahedra.

LaB_{6} is an inert refractory compound, used in hot cathodes because of its low work function which gives it a high rate of thermionic emission of electrons; YB_{66} crystals, grown by an indirect-heating floating zone method, are used as monochromators for low-energy synchrotron X-rays. VB_{2} has shown some promise as potential material with higher energy capacity than lithium for batteries.

=== Metal rich borides (B:M less than 4:1) ===
The transition metals tend to form metal rich borides. Metal-rich borides, as a group, are inert and have high melting temperature. Some are easily formed and this explains their use in making turbine blades, rocket nozzles, etc. Some examples include AlB_{2} and TiB_{2}. Recent investigations into this class of borides have revealed a wealth of interesting properties such as super conductivity at 39 K in MgB_{2} and the ultra-incompressibility of OsB_{2} and ReB_{2}.

=== Boride structures ===
The boron rich borides contain 3-dimensional frameworks of boron atoms that can include boron polyhedra. The metal rich borides contain single boron atoms, B_{2} units, boron chains or boron sheets/layers.

Examples of the different types of borides are:

- isolated boron atoms, example Mn_{4}B
- B_{2} units, example V_{3}B
- chains of boron atoms, example FeB
- sheets or layers of boron atoms CrB_{2}
- 3-dimensional boron frameworks that include boron polyhedra, example NaB_{15} with boron icosahedra

| Formula | CAS registry number | density (g/cm^{3}) | melting point (°C) | electrical resistivity (10^{−8}Ω·m) | Knoop hardness (0.1 kp load) |
|---|---|---|---|---|---|
| TiB_{2} | 12045-63-5 | 4.38 | 3225 | 9–15 | 2600 |
| ZrB_{2} | 12045-64-6 | 6.17 | 3050 | 7–10 | 1830 |
| HfB_{2} | 12007-23-7 | 11.2 | 3250 | 10–12 | 2160 |
| VB_{2} | 12007-37-3 | 5.10 | 2450 | 16–38 | 2110 |
| NbB | 12045-19-1 | 7.5 | 2270 | - | - |
| NbB_{2} | 12007-29-3 | 6.97 | 3050 | 12–65 | 2130 |
| TaB | 12007-07-7 | 14.2 | 2040 | - | - |
| TaB_{2} | 12007-35-1 | 11.2 | 3100 | 14–68 | 2500 |
| CrB_{2} | 12007-16-8 | 5.20 | 2170 | 21–56 | 1100 |
| Mo_{2}B_{5} | 12007-97-5 | 7.48 | 2370 | 18–45 | 2180 |
| W_{2}B_{5} | 12007-98-6 | 14.8 | 2370 | 21–56 | 2500 |
| Fe_{2}B | 12006-85-8 | 7.3 | 1389 | - | 1800 |
| FeB | 12006-84-7 | 7 | 1658 | 30 | 1900 |
| CoB | 12006-77-8 | 7.25 | 1460 | 26 | 2350 |
| Co_{2}B | 12045-01-1 | 8.1 | 1280 | - | - |
| NiB | 12007-00-0 | 7.13 | 1034 | 23 | - |
| Ni_{2}B | 12007-01-1 | 7.90 | 1125 | - | - |
| LaB_{6} | 12008-21-8 | 6.15 | 2715 | 15 | 2010 |
| UB_{4} | 12007-84-0 | 9.32 | 2530 | 30 | 1850 |
| UB_{2} | 12007-36-2 | 12.7 | 2430 | - | - |

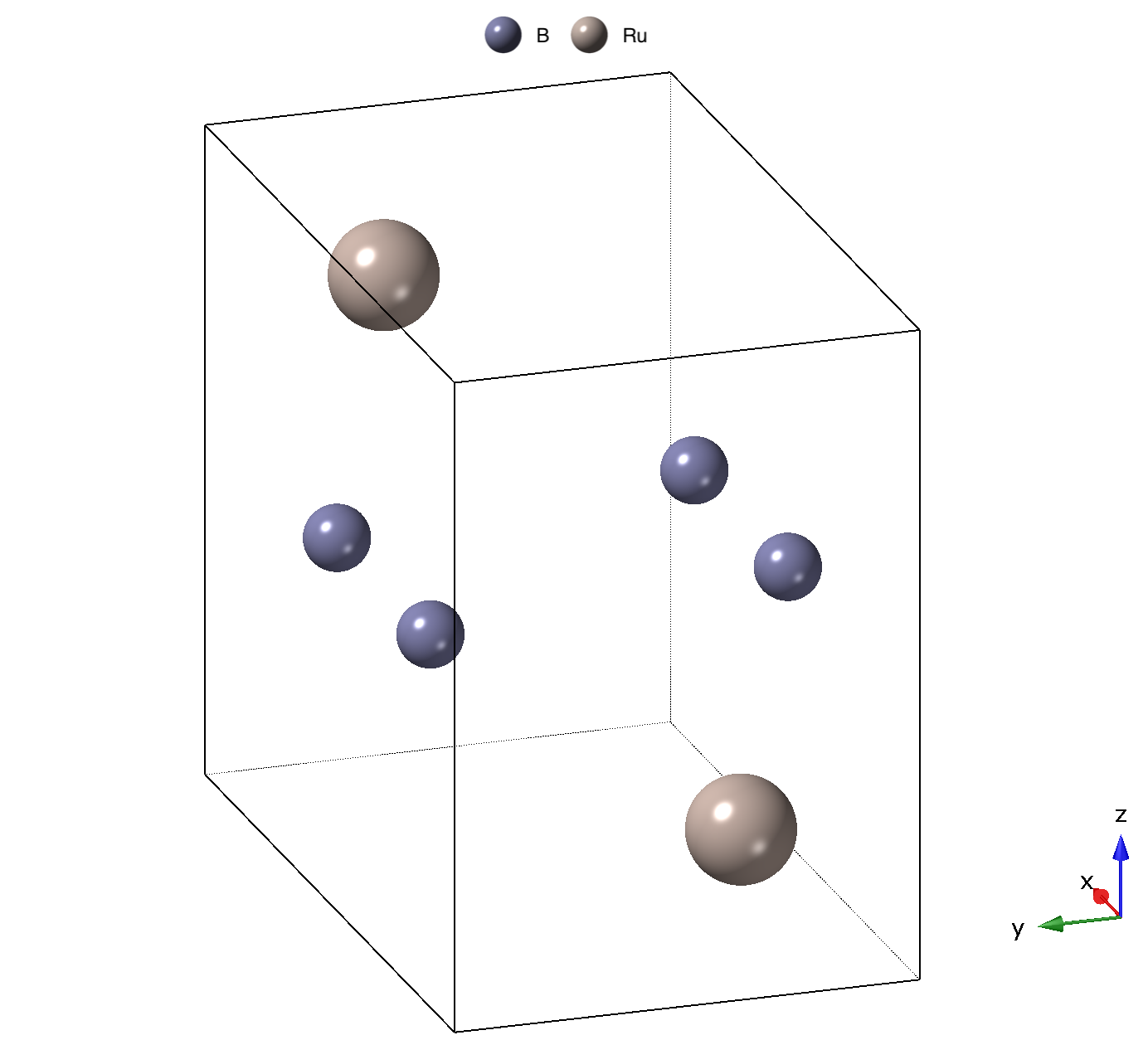
Unit cell of RuB_{2}

== See also ==
- Crystal structure of boron-rich metal borides
- Iron tetraboride
- Yttrium borides - a representative class of metal borides
- Magnesium diboride - a superconductor

== Books ==
- Greenwood, Norman N.; Earnshaw, Alan (1997). Chemistry of the Elements (2nd ed.). Butterworth-Heinemann. doi:10.1016/C2009-0-30414-6. ISBN 978-0-08-037941-8.
- Cotton, F. Albert; Wilkinson, Geoffrey; Murillo, Carlos A.; Bochmann, Manfred (1999), Advanced Inorganic Chemistry (6th ed.), New York: Wiley-Interscience, ISBN 0-471-19957-5
