= Borosilicide =

Boride silicides (also called borosilicides) are mixed anion compounds containing silicide and boride linked into anions.

== Synthesis ==
Boride silicides may be produced by melting together the elements in a boron nitride crucible, sealed in tantalum. Tin may be used as a solvent. Alkali metal iodides can also be used as a solvent.

== Use ==
Borosilicides are of interest in research for ultra-high temperature materials for use in jet engines, catalysts and also for thermoelectric materials.

== Structure ==
There are not many different structures for borosilicides, particularly compared to the boride carbides. Most known compounds are rich in boron, but a few are rich in silicon. The boron and silicon atoms do not appear as isolated ions, but are covalently bound into a network. Boron networks found in metal borides are enlarged by the addition of silicon, which allows inclusion of metal atoms that are larger than would otherwise be stable.

Transition elements can form a tetragonal M_{5}SiB_{2} series of compounds. These are called MAB phases (M for metal, A here is silicon, and B is boron). However the compounds for zirconium and hafnium are energetically unfavourable.

== List ==
| formula | system | space group | unit cell Å, | volume | density | comment | ref |
|---|---|---|---|---|---|---|---|
| α-SiB_{3} | rhombohedral | | | | | band gap 0.2 eV; ignites 600 °C | |
| β-SiB_{3} (Si_{4}B_{11.6}C_{0.4}) | orthorhombic | Imma | a = 8.3915 b = 12.5680 c = 6.2134 Z = 16 | 655.29 | 2.454 | transluscent and amber; Si_{4} chain and B_{12} cluster; band gap 2.0 eV; acid and base resistant; stands hot oxygen | |
| LiBSi_{2} | tetragonal | P4_{2}/nmc | a=6.83225, c=8.83924 Z=8 | | | seven, six and five-membered rings; dark gray; moisture and acid stable; band gap 1.1 eV | |
| Li_{2}B_{12}Si_{2} | orthorhombic | Cmce | a=6.1060 b=10.979 c=8.4050 Z=4 | | | transparent yellow; Vickers hardness=20.3 GPa; band gap 2.27 eV | |
| Na_{2}B_{6}Si_{2} | trigonal | R3̅m | a = 5.0735 c = 16.0004 Z=3 | 356.3 | | closo [B_{6}]^{2−} (Si_{2})^{0} | |
| Na_{8}B_{4.1}Si_{41.9} | cubic | I4̅3m | a=9.699 V=906.87 | | | | |
| Na_{8}B_{74.5}Si_{17.5} | hexagonal | P6_{3}/mmc | a = 10.2392 c = 10.9215 Z=1 | 991.62 | 2.480 | black; Na_{8}(B_{12})_{6}Si_{16}[BSi]_{1.5}[B_{2}]_{0.5}. B_{12} | |
| MgB_{12}Si_{2} | orthorhombic | Pnma | a=10.980 b=6.1098 c=8.3646 Z=4 | | | yellow-green; B_{12} icosahedra linked by Si | |
| Mg_{3}B_{36}Si_{9}C | trigonal | R3̅m | a=10.079 c=16.372 | | | black; acid stable; Vickers hardness 17.0 GPa | |
| Na_{3}MgB_{37}Si_{9} | trigonal | R3̅m | a = 10.1630 c = 16.5742 Z=3 | 1482.5 | | | |
| K_{7}B_{7}Si_{39} | cubic | Pm3̅n | a=9.952 | | | clathrate | |
| ScB_{12.0}C_{0.65}Si_{0.071} | cubic | F43m | a=20.3085 | | | | |
| V_{5}SiB_{2} | tetragonal | I4/mcm | a=5.810 c=10.790 | | | | |
| CrSi_{3}(B_{12})Se_{12}(B_{2}Se_{3})_{1.33} | hexagonal | P6_{3}22 | a=12.9772 c=9.532 Z=2 | 1390.2 | | black | |
| Mn_{5}SiB_{2} | tetragonal | I4/mcm | a=5.619 c=10.458 | 330.17 | | | |
| CrMn_{4}SiB_{2} | tetragonal | I4/mcm | a=5.6064 c=10.4244 | 327.6 | 6.517 | ferromagnetic Curie T=270 K | |
| Fe_{5}SiB_{2} | tetragonal | I4/mcm | a=5.555 c=10.342 | 319.17 | | | |
| Co_{4.75}Si_{2}B | tetragonal | I4/mcm | a=8.648 c=4.265 | 318.9 | | | |
| Ni_{6}Si_{2}B | hexagonal | P6̅2m | a=6.111 c=2.884 | 93.252 | | | |
| Rb_{8}B_{8}Si_{38} | cubic | Pm3̅n | a = 9.9583 V=987.69 Z=1 | | 3.0902 | air and water stable; semiconductor; | |
| YB_{17.6}Si_{4.6} | rhombohedral | R3m | a=10.0841 c=16.4714 | | | | |
| YB_{41}Si_{1.2} | orthorhombic | Pbam | a=16.674 b=17.667 c=9.5110 | | | | |
| Y_{1−x}B_{12}Si_{3.3−δ} (0⩽x⩽0.5, δ≈0.3) | rhombohedral | R3̅m | a=10.080 c=16.426 Z=9 | | | | |
| YB_{44}Si_{2} | orthorhombic | Pbam | a=16.674 b=17.667 c=9.511 | 2801.7 | | | |
| Y_{2.04}(B_{12})_{3}(CSi)Si_{8} | trigonal | R3̅m | | | | | |
| Y_{5}Si_{2}B_{8} | tetragonal | P4/mbm | Z=2 | | | | |
| Y_{2}B_{36}Si_{9}C | trigonal | R3̅m | a=10.0344 c=16.348 | | | | |
| Nb_{5}SiB_{2} | tetragonal | I4/mcm | a=6.569 c=11.878 Z=4 | | | Superconductor Tc=7 K; for Nb_{5}Si_{2.4}B_{0.6} 7.8K | |
| Nb_{4}VSiB_{2} | tetragonal | I4/mcm | | | | | |
| Nb_{4}CrSiB_{2} | tetragonal | I4/mcm | a = 6.109 c = 11.547 | | | | |
| Mo_{5}SiB_{2} | tetragonal | I4/mcm | a=6.0272 c=11.0671 Z=4 | | | oxidises to borosilicate; Superconductor Tc=5.6 K | |
| Mo_{4}VSiB_{2} | tetragonal | I4/mcm | a= 5.9669 c= 11.02129 | | | | |
| Mo_{4}MnSiB_{2} | tetragonal | I4/mcm | a = 5.938 c = 11.057 | | | | |
| Ti_{4}MoSiB_{2} | tetragonal | I4/mcm | a= 6.13262 c= 11.52567 | | | band gap 4.1 eV | |
| Mo_{4}CrSiB_{2} | tetragonal | I4/mcm | a = 5.939 c = 11.016 | | | | |
| Cs_{8}B_{8}Si_{38} | cubic | Pm3̅n | a=10.0312 Z=1 | 1009.39 | 3.647 | formed under pressure; semiconductor; 3D network of dodecahedra and 14-hedra enclosing Cs ions | |
| CeSi_{1·5}B_{0.5} | hexagonal | P6/mmm | a = 3.9922 c = 4.3053 | | | | |
| GdB_{18}Si_{5} | tetragonal | P4/mbm | a=7.2665 c=8.2229 | | | | |
| GdB_{44}Si_{2} | | | | | | | |
| Gd_{2}B_{36}Si_{9}C | trigonal | R3̅m | a=10.0955 c=16.454 | | | | |
| Gd_{5}Si_{2}B_{8} | tetragonal | P4/mbm | a=7.2665 c=8.2229 | | | metallic | |
| Gd_{5}Si_{3}B_{0.6} | hexagonal | P6_{3}/mcm | a=8.5080 c=6.4141 | | | | |
| Gd_{5}Si_{23}B_{8} | | | | | | B_{6} octahedra and Si_{2} | |
| Gd_{1−x}B_{12}Si_{3.3−δ} (0⩽x⩽0.5, δ≈0.3) | rhombohedral | R3̅m | a=10.069 c=16.447 Z=9 | | | | |
| Sm_{5}Si_{2}B_{8} | tetragonal | P4/mbm | a=7.2616 c=8.2660 Z=2 | | | | |
| TbB_{41}Si_{1.2} | orthorhombic | Pbam | | | | ferromagnetic < 18 K; B_{12}Si_{3} and B_{12} polyhedra | |
| Tb_{9}B_{3}Si_{13.83} | | R32 | a = 6.668 c = 12.405 Z=1 | | | | |
| Tb_{3-x}C_{2}Si_{8}(B_{12})_{3} | | | | | | | |
| Tb_{1−x}B_{12}Si_{3.3−δ} (0⩽x⩽0.5, δ≈0.3) | rhombohedral | R3̅m | a =10.075 b =10.075 c =16.41 Z=9 | | | | |
| TbB_{44}Si_{2} | orthorhombic | Pbam | a=16.651 b=17.661 c=9.500 | 2793.7 | | | |
| Tb_{1.8}C_{2}Si_{8}(B_{12})_{3} | rhombohedral | R3̅m | a=10.1171 c=16.397 Z=3 | 1453.4 | | band gap 0.9 eV | |
| Tb_{2}B_{36}Si_{9}C | trigonal | R3̅m | a=10.0307 c=16.352 | | | | |
| Tb_{5}Si_{2}B_{8} | tetragonal | P4/mbm | a=7.2616 c=8.2660 Z=2 | | | | |
| Dy_{0.7}B_{12.33}Si_{3} | trigonal | R3̅m | a=10.0782 c=16.4651 Z=9 | 1448.3 | | black | |
| Dy_{1−x}B_{12}Si_{3.3−δ} (0⩽x⩽0.5, δ≈0.3) | rhombohedral | R3̅m | a=10.058 c=16.412 Z=9 | | | | |
| DyB_{44}Si_{2} | orthorhombic | Pbam | a=16.658 b=17.655 c=9.508( | 2796.3 | | | |
| Dy_{2}B_{36}Si_{9}C | trigonal | R3̅m | a=10.0735 c=16.323 | | | | |
| Dy_{2.1}(B_{12})_{3}(CSi)Si_{8} | trigonal | R3̅m | | | | | |
| Dy_{5}Si_{2}B_{8} | tetragonal | P4/mbm | Z=2 | | | | |
| Ho_{1−x}B_{12}Si_{3.3−δ} (0⩽x⩽0.5, δ≈0.3) | rhombohedral | R3̅m | a=10.062 c=16.365 Z=9 | | | | |
| HoB_{44}Si_{2} | orthorhombic | Pbam | a=16.608 b=17.578 c=9.492 | 2771.1 | | | |
| Ho_{5}Si_{2}B_{8} | tetragonal | P4/mbm | a=7.1830 c=8.9900 Z=2 | | | | |
| Ho_{2}B_{36}Si_{9}C | trigonal | R3̅m | a=10.0643 c=16.2699 | | | | |
| Er_{1−x}B_{12}Si_{3.3−δ} (0⩽x⩽0.5, δ≈0.3) | rhombohedral | R3̅m | a=10.047 c=16.393 Z=9 | | | | |
| ErB_{44}Si_{2} | orthorhombic | Pbam | a=16.600 b=17.621 c=9.485(5) | 2774.4 | | | |
| Er_{2}B_{36}Si_{9}C | trigonal | R3̅m | a=10.016 c=16.309 | | | | |
| Er_{3}Si_{3.83} B (Er_{18}Si_{23}B_{6}) | trigonal | R32 | a = 6.5568 c = 24.5541 Z = 6 | 914.19 | 6.82 | shiny grey | |
| Er_{8}B_{3}Si_{17} | orthorhombic | Cmc2_{1} | a=4.0128b=28.867 c=3.8413 Z=1 | | | | |
| Tm_{1−x}B_{12}Si_{3.3−δ} (0⩽x⩽0.5, δ≈0.3) | rhombohedral | R3̅m | a=10.068 c=16.350 Z=9 | | | | |
| TmB_{44}Si_{2} | orthorhombic | Pbam | a=16.655 b=17.667 c=9.494 | 2793.6 | | | |
| Tm_{2}B_{36}Si_{9}C | trigonal | R3̅m | a=10.0156 c=16.296 | | | | |
| Yb_{1−x}B_{12}Si_{3.3−δ} (0⩽x⩽0.5, δ≈0.3) | rhombohedral | R3̅m | a=10.095 c=16.470 Z=9 | | | | |
| YbB_{44}Si_{2} | orthorhombic | Pbam | a=16.636 b=17.644 c=9.488 | 2785.0 | | | |
| YbB_{45.6}Si_{1.0} | orthorhombic | | a=16.636 b=17.644 c=9.488 | | | | |
| YbB_{3}Si_{13.83} | | R32 | a = 6.5796 c = 12.2599 Z=1 | | | | |
| Yb_{2}B_{36}Si_{9}C | trigonal | R3̅m | a=10.1103 c=16.314 | | | | |
| Lu_{1−x}B_{12}Si_{3.3−δ} (0⩽x⩽0.5, δ≈0.3) | rhombohedral | R3̅m | a=10.062 c=16.297 Z=9 | | | | |
| Hf_{5}Si_{3}B_{0.2} | hexagonal | P6_{3}/mcm | a = 7.8557 c = 5.52622 Z=2 | | | Ultra-high temperature ceramic | |
| W_{5}SiB_{2} | tetragonal | I4/mcm | | | | Superconductor Tc = 5.8 K | |
| W_{4}CrSiB_{2} | tetragonal | I4/mcm | a = b: 5.942 c = 10.948 | | | | |
| W_{4.5}Ta_{0.5}SiB_{2} | tetragonal | I4/mcm | | | | Superconductor Tc=6.5 K | |
