= UB2 =

UB2 may refer to:

- UB2, a postcode district in the UB postcode area
- SM UB-2, World War I German submarine
- UB_{2}, Uranium diboride
- ub2, a name given, in one edition of the Pentium Pro documentation, for the ud2 instruction
