= Aluminium boride =

Aluminium boride may refer to

- Aluminium diboride, AlB_{2}
- Aluminium dodecaboride, AlB_{12}
