= Plutonium diboride =

Identifiers
CAS Number	12007-32-8
3D model (JSmol)	Interactive image
- InChI: InChI=1S/2BH2.Pu/h2*1H2; Key: JPIABPHIZVZWOR-UHFFFAOYSA-N
- SMILES: [Pu].[B].[B]

Properties
Chemical formula	PuB_{2}
Molar mass	266 g·mol^{−1}
Appearance	crystals
Density	12,06 g/cm^{3}

Related compounds
Other cations	Neptunium diboride; Uranium diboride
- Except where otherwise noted, data are given for materials in their standard state (at 25 °C [77 °F], 100 kPa). Infobox references

Plutonium diboride is an compound of plutonium and boron with the chemical formula PuB_{2}. It is one of the plutonium borides.

== Synthesis ==
Fusion of stoichiometric amounts of pure substances:

Pu + 2B → PuB_{2}

== Physical properties ==
Plutonium diboride forms paramagnetic crystals of hexagonal crystal structure, space group P 6/mmm.

== Chemical properties ==
The compound decomposes upon heating:

2PuB_{2} → Pu + PuB_{4}
