= Aggregated diamond nanorod =

Nanocrystalline form of diamond

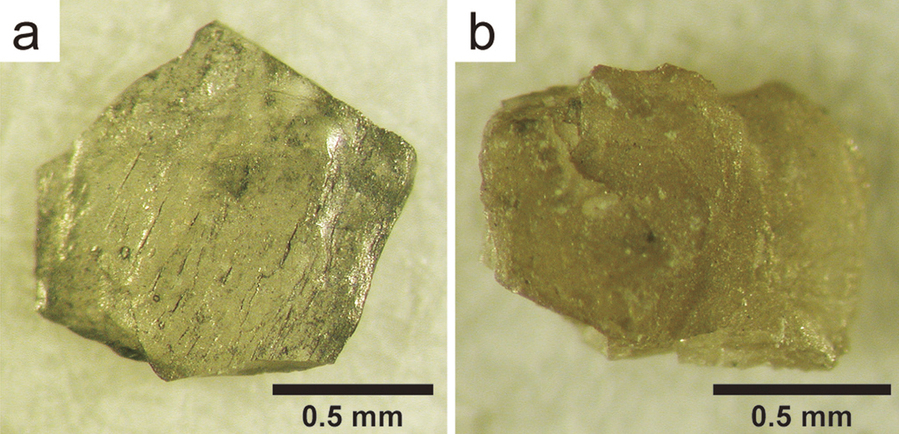
Natural nanodiamond aggregates from the Popigai impact structure, Siberia, Russia.

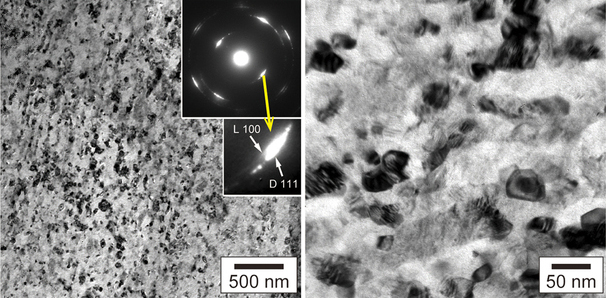
Internal structure of the Popigai nanodiamonds.

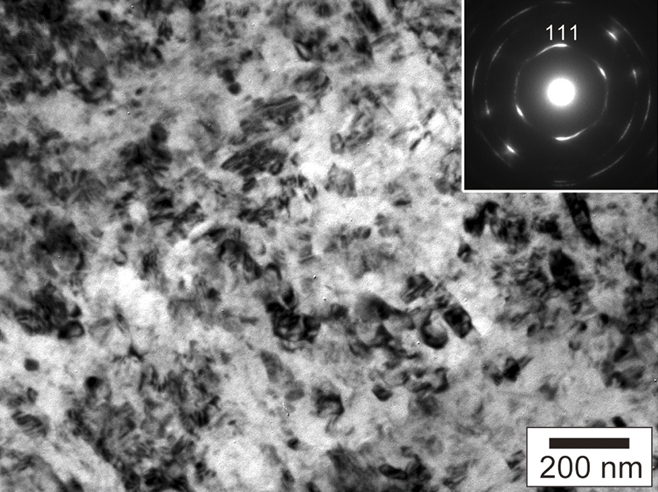
Internal structure of synthetic nanodiamonds.

Aggregated diamond nanorods, or ADNRs, are a nanocrystalline form of diamond, also known as nanodiamond or hyperdiamond.

== Discovery ==
Nanodiamond or hyperdiamond was produced by compression of graphite in 2003 by a group of researchers in Japan and in the same work, published in Nature, it was shown to be much harder than bulk diamond. Later, it was also produced by compression of fullerene and confirmed to be the hardest and least compressible known material, with an isothermal bulk modulus of 491 gigapascals (GPa), while a conventional diamond has a modulus of 442–446 GPa; these results were inferred from X-ray diffraction data, which also indicated that ADNRs are 0.3% denser than regular diamond. The same group later described ADNRs as "having a hardness and Young's modulus comparable to that of natural diamond, but with 'superior wear resistance'".

== Hardness ==
A <111> surface (normal to the largest diagonal of a cube) of pure diamond has a hardness value of 167±6 GPa when scratched with a nanodiamond tip, while the nanodiamond sample itself has a value of 310 GPa when tested with a nanodiamond tip. However, the test only works properly with a tip made of harder material than the sample being tested due to cracking. This means that the true value for nanodiamond is likely lower than 310 GPa. Due to its hardness, a hyperdiamond could possibly exceed 10 on the Mohs scale of mineral hardness.

== Chemical properties ==
Nanodiamond starts oxidizing at approximately 750 K (890 °F; 477 °C), which is lower than the oxidization onset temperature of natural diamond.

== Synthesis ==
ADNRs (hyperdiamonds/nanodiamonds) are produced by compressing fullerite powder—a solid form of allotropic carbon fullerene—by either of two somewhat similar methods. One uses a diamond anvil cell and applied pressure ~37 GPa without heating the cell. In another method, fullerite is compressed to lower pressures (2–20 GPa) and then heated to a temperature in the range of 300 to 2,500 K (27 to 2,227 °C). Extreme hardness of what now appears likely to have been nanodiamonds was reported by researchers in the 1990s. The material is a series of interconnected diamond nanorods, with diameters of between 5 and 20 nanometres and lengths of around 1 micrometre each.

Nanodiamond aggregates ca. 1 mm in size also form in nature, from graphite upon meteoritic impact, such as that of the Popigai impact structure in Siberia, Russia.

== See also ==
- Adamant – Mythological hardest substance
- Carbon nanotube – Allotropes of carbon with a cylindrical nanostructure
- Diamond – Form of carbon
- Fullerite – Allotrope of carbon
- Lonsdaleite – Hexagonal lattice allotrope of carbon
- Mohs scale of mineral hardness – Classification framework for scratch resistance
- Rhenium diboride
- Superhard material – Material with Vickers hardness exceeding 40 gigapascals
