= Aluminium dodecaboride =

Names
- IUPAC name Aluminium dodecaboride
- Other names AlB_{12}

Identifiers
CAS Number	12041-54-2
3D model (JSmol)	Interactive image
ECHA InfoCard	100.031.737
EC Number	234-924-2
PubChem CID	6336895
- InChI: InChI=1S/Al.12B Key: JXOOCQBAIRXOGG-UHFFFAOYSA-N
- SMILES: [B].[B].[B].[B].[B].[B].[B].[B].[B].[B].[B].[B].[Al]

Properties
Chemical formula	AlB_{12}
Molar mass	156.714 g/mol
Appearance	Yellow to black solid
Density	2.55 g/cm^{3}
Melting point	2,070 °C (3,760 °F; 2,340 K)
Solubility in water	insoluble
Solubility	soluble in hot nitric acid (decomposes), soluble in nitric acid (decomposes), soluble in sulfuric acid (decomposes)

Structure
Crystal structure	Tetragonal (α-form); Orthorhombic (β-form)
- Except where otherwise noted, data are given for materials in their standard state (at 25 °C [77 °F], 100 kPa). verify (what is ?) Infobox references

Aluminium dodecaboride (AlB_{12}) is a superhard chemical compound with 17% aluminium content by weight.

It is the hardest boride of the aluminium-boron system, which also includes AlB_{10}, AlB_{4}, AlB_{2} and AlB.

== Properties ==
There are two crystalline forms, α-AlB_{12}, and γ-AlB_{12}. Both forms are very similar and consist of a framework with three-dimensional networks of B_{12} and B_{20} units. The phase β-AlB_{12} is now believed to be the ternary boride C_{2}Al_{3}B_{48}.

== Preparation ==
The β-form can be prepared by the reaction of boron(III) oxide with sulfur and aluminium, then adding carbon to the mixture.

== Uses ==
The extreme hardness of AlB_{12} makes it a favorable component of PCBN inserts, which are mainly used in cutting and grinding to replace diamond or corundum.

== See also ==
- Boron
- Aluminium boride
