= Β-Carbon nitride =

β-Carbon nitride
- Lattice structure of β-C_{3}N_{4} (plane projection). Each carbon atom has four bonds and each nitrogen atom three; bonds not depicted are to atoms in the layer above or below.

Names
- IUPAC name β-Carbon nitride

Identifiers
3D model (JSmol)	Interactive image
MeSH	Carbon+nitride
- InChI: InChI=1S/N4C3/c1-5-2-6(1)3(5)7(1,2)4(5)6
- SMILES: N13[C]25N4[C]16N2[C]34N56

Properties
Chemical formula	C_{3}N_{4}
Molar mass	92.061 g·mol^{−1}

Structure
Crystal structure	Hexagonal, hP14
Space group	P6_{3}/m No. 176
Lattice constant	a = 6.36 Å, c = 4.648 Å
- Except where otherwise noted, data are given for materials in their standard state (at 25 °C [77 °F], 100 kPa). Infobox references

β-Carbon nitride (beta-carbon nitride), β-C_{3}N_{4}, is a superhard material predicted to be harder than diamond.

The material was first proposed in 1985 by Amy Liu and Marvin L. Cohen. Examining the nature of crystalline bonds they theorised that carbon and nitrogen atoms could form a particularly short and strong bond in a stable crystal lattice in a ratio of 1:1.3, and that this material could be harder than diamond.

Nanosized crystals and nanorods of β-carbon nitride can be prepared by mechanochemical processing.

== Production ==
=== Processing ===
β-C_{3}N_{4} can be synthesized in a mechanochemical reaction. This method involves ball milling of high-purity graphite powders down to an amorphous nanoscale size under an argon atmosphere. Then argon is replaced by an NH_{3} gas atmosphere, which helps to form nanosized flake-like β-C_{3}N_{4}. During ball milling, fracture and welding of the reactants and graphite powder particles occur repeatedly from ball/powder collisions. Plastic deformation of the graphite powder particles occur due to the shear bands decomposing into sub-grains that are separated by low-angle grain boundaries, further milling decreases the sub-grain size until nanosize sub-grains form. The high pressure and intense motion promotes catalytic dissociation of NH_{3} molecules into monatomic nitrogen on the fractured surface of the carbon. Nanosized carbon powders act substantially different from its bulk material as a result of particle dimension and surface area, causing the nanosized carbon to easily react with the free nitrogen atoms, forming β-C_{3}N_{4} powder.

=== Producing nanorods ===
Single crystal β-C_{3}N_{4} nanorods can be formed after the powder-like or flake-like compound is thermally annealed with an NH_{3} gas flow. The size of the nanorods is determined by the temperature and time of thermal annealing. These nanorods grow faster in their axis direction than the diameter direction and have hemispherical-like ends. A cross section of the nanorods indicates that their section morphology is prismatic. It was discovered that they contain amorphous phases, however when annealed to 450 °C for three hours under an NH_{3} atmosphere, the amount of the amorphous phase diminished to almost none. These nanorods are dense and twinned rather than nanotubes. Synthesizing these nanorods through thermal annealing provides an effective, low-cost, high-yield method for the synthesis of single crystal nanorods.

=== Alternate methods of synthesis ===
Rather than forming a powder or nanorod, the carbon nitride compound can alternatively be formed in thin amorphous films by either shock-wave compression technology, pyrolysis of high nitrogen content precursors, diode sputtering, solvothermal preparation, pulsed laser ablation, or ion implantation.

=== Difficulties of processing ===
Although extensive studies on the process and synthesis of the formed carbon nitride have been reported, the nitrogen concentration of the compound tends to be below the ideal composition for C_{3}N_{4}. This is due to the low thermodynamic stability with respect to carbon phases and N_{2} gas, indicated by a positive value of the enthalpies of formation. The commercial exploitation of nanopowders is very limited by the high synthesis cost along with difficult methods of production that causes a low yield.

== Characteristics ==
=== Morphology ===
β-C_{3}N_{4} has the same crystal structure as β-Si_{3}N_{4} with a hexagonal network of tetrahedrally (sp^{3}) bonded carbon and trigonal planar nitrogen (sp^{2}). Thermal annealing can be used to change the crystal morphology from flake-like into sphere- or rod-like structures. The nanorods are generally straight and contain no other defects.

=== Properties ===
A hardness equal or above that of diamond (the hardest known material) has been predicted, but not yet demonstrated.

== See also ==
- Graphitic carbon nitride
- Heterodiamond
- Superhard materials
