= Boride carbide =

Class of chemical compounds

Boride carbides, borocarbides or carboborides are chemical compounds composed of metal along with boride and carbide anions. They are mostly metallic in nature, strong, resistant to heat, and some are superconductors.

Boride carbides form crystalline ceramics of a wide range of composition. They have been called "a toy box for solid state physicists".

Four structure classes exist based on the dimensionality of the carbon-boron structure. One category has metal atoms embedded in a 3D-net of boron-carbon. Also there are those with a two-dimensional network of boron and carbon, alternating with sheets of metal atoms. Thirdly are those with a one-dimensional boron-carbon structure embedded in channels in the metal. Lastly there are zero-dimensional molecular-like carbon-boron structures embedded in holes in the metal. Substances with B_{2}C_{2} can be termed diborodicarbides. An example series of 2D materials is (RC)_{m}(Ni_{2}B_{2})_{n} with R a rare earth, has layers of RC alongside NiB layers.

In the zero-dimensional case, dicarbidoborate [BC_{2}]^{5−} or CBC^{5−} or CBC^{7−} can exist isoelectronic with azides and cyanates. Other finite chain structures exist like [BC_{3}]^{5−} [B_{2}C_{2}]^{6−} [B_{2}C_{4}]^{6−} [B_{3}C_{3}]^{7−} [B_{4}C_{4}]^{8−} [B_{4}C_{7}]^{8−} [B_{5}C_{8}]^{9−} [B_{5}C_{5}]^{9−} (C^{2−}=B^{−}=C=B^{−}=B^{−}=C=B^{−}=C=B^{−}=C^{2−}) [B_{5}C_{6}]^{9−}

Additional carbon ions may be in the form of C^{4−} [C_{2}]^{2−} [C_{2}]^{4−} [C_{2}]^{6−} or [C_{3}]^{4−} Carbidonitridoborate CBN^{4−} also can be made if nitrogen is present. As of 2024, [OBC]^{3−} or [NCB]^{4−} have not been discovered.

Boride carbides are formed by melting together elements, or carbides and borides.

Hydrogen can be absorbed without changing the structure as in YNi_{2}B_{2}CH_{0.2}. Some compounds also contain halogens, which are not bound to carbon or boron, being found as independent ions.

Due to their extremely high melting point and ability to retain strength when heated, boride carbides are under investigation for use in ultra-high temperature applications, such as in supersonic vehicles. The 3D varieties are under consideration as high temperature superconductors. Some of these compounds are under investigation for thermoelectric applications.

== List ==
formula	space group	unit cell	remarks	ref
LiBC				
LiBC_{3}	P6̅m2	a = 2.4588 c = 6.770	metallic grey	
LiB_{2}C_{2}	P6_{3}/mmc	a = 2.5930 c = 22.680		
t-LiB_{2}C_{2}	P4̅m2	a=4.1389 c=7.1055 Z=2		
o-LiB_{13}C_{2}	Imma	a = 5.668 b = 10.820 c = 8.040	colourless; acid stable; B_{12}^{2−} and CBC^{+}; band gap 3.32 eV	
r-Li_{~1}B_{13}C_{2}	R3̅m	a = 5.6535 c = 12.5320	transparent	
Li_{2}B_{2}C				
Li_{2}B_{12}C_{2}	Amm2	a = 4.706 b = 9.010 c = 5.65 Z = 2	pale greenish yellow; acid stable; B_{12}^{2−} and C_{2}	
BeB_{2}C_{2}	Pmmn	a=6.13425 b=5.4220 c=4.6928		
NaB_{5}C	Pm3̅m	a = 4.0925 Z=1	density=2.16 black; air sensitive	
NaB_{13}C_{2}	Imma	a = 10.9417 b = 5.6756 c = 8.0898	reddish black metallic	
MgB_{2}C_{2}	Cmca	a = 10.922 b = 9.461 c = 7.459	red transparent; brittle; layers _{∞}^{2} [BC]^{−}	
MgB_{2}C_{2}	Pnnm	a = 7.19633 b = 4.6179 c = 2.77714		
MgB_{12}C_{2}	C2/c	a=7.274 b=8.777 c=7.282 β=105.33° Z=4	B_{12} and C	
MgB_{12}C_{2}	Imma	a=5.613 b=9.828 c=7.933 Z=4	B_{12} and C_{2}	
Mg_{1.42}B_{25}C_{4}	P2_{1}/c	а = 9.626 b = 11.329 c = 8.966 β = 105.80° V = 940.8 Å^{3}	density=2.505 g/cm^{3}	
MgB_{50}C_{8}				
Mg_{3}B_{50}C_{8}	C2/m	a = 8.938 b = 5.6514 c = 9.602 β = 105.86° Z = 1	(B_{12})_{4}(CBC)_{2}(C_{2})_{2} Dicarbidoborate	
AlB_{40}C_{4}				
Al_{2}B_{51}C_{8}			diamond like	
Al_{3}BC	hexagonal	a=3.491 c=11.541		
Al_{3}BC_{3}	P3̅c1	a=5.900 c=15.900 V=479.0 Z=6	light-yellow transparent; water stable; dissolve in HF or HNO_{3}; CBC + AlC_{3} layers; density=2.66	
Al_{3}B_{48}C_{2}			diamond-like	
Mg_{3}B_{36}Si_{9}C	R3̅m	a=10.079 c=16.372	black; acid stable; Vickers hardness 17.0 GPa	
LiB_{12}PC	Imma	a=10.188 b=5.7689 c=8.127 Z=4	colourless	
LiB_{12}P_{0.89}C_{1.11}			brown	
LiB_{12}P_{1.13}C_{0.87}	Imma	a=10.410 b=5.9029 c=8.204	red	
KB_{5}C	Pm3̅m	a=4.1281 Z=1	black; air sensitive	
CaB_{2}C_{2}	I4/mcm	a = 5.3733 c = 7.4155 Z = 4	8 and 4 member rings of BC in sheets;	
CaB_{2}C_{4}	P6/mmm	a = 4.55971 c = 4.4020		
CaB_{2}C_{6}	P6/mmm	a = 2.58390 c = 4.43597		
Ca_{5}Cl_{3}(C_{2})(CBC)	Cmcm	a=3.8924 b =13.891 c=18.59 V=1005.2	orange-brown transparent; water sensitive; CC and CBC	
Ca_{3}Cl_{2}CBN	Pnma		carbidonitridoborate CBN^{4−}	
Ca_{15}(CBN)_{6}(C_{2})_{2}F_{2}	Ia3̅d	a=16.5364	dark red; decompose in moist air; carbidonitridoborate CBN^{4−}	
Ca_{15}(CBN)_{6}(C_{2})_{2}O			carbidonitridoborate CBN^{4−}	
Ca_{3}(CBN)Br_{2}			carbidonitridoborate CBN^{4−}	
Ca_{9}Cl_{8}(BC_{2})_{2}	Cmcm	a = 11.6291 b = 13.416 c = 12.0862 Z = 4	pale red transparent; sensitive to dampness;	
ScB_{2}C	P4_{2}/mbc	a=6.651 c=6.763 V=299.1	density 3.502; 2D net of seven and four-membered rings	
ScBC_{2}			0-D BC_{2}	
ScB_{2}C_{2}	Pbam	a = 5.175 b = 10.075 c = 3.440	tough, water resistant, melts over 2500 °C	
ScB_{3}C_{3}	Pm3̅n	a = 4.609	clathrate; metallic; air sensitive	
ScB_{17}C_{0.25}	P6/mmm	a=14.550 c=8.4543		
Sc_{2}BC_{2}	I4/mmm	a=3.3259 c=10.674 Z=2		
Sc_{2}B_{1.1}C_{3.2}	P3m1	a=3.3991 c=6.7140 or a=23.710 c=6.703	[B_{1/3}C_{2/3}]_{∞} with Sc-C-Sc layers	
Sc_{3}B_{5}C_{3}	tetragonal	a=3.3308 c=7.680		
Sc_{3}B_{0.75}C_{3}	P4/mmm	a=3.33150 c=7.6737		
ScB_{15}C_{0.80}				
ScB_{15}C_{1.60}	orthorhombic	a=10.027 b=8.0138 c=5.6668		
Sc_{12}B_{185}C_{9}	P6/mmm	a = 14.550 c = 8.954 V = 1641.7 Å^{3}		
Sc_{20⁢}BC_{27}	P4/ncc	a = 7.5042 c =10.0386	superconductor Tc=7.8K; also ranging to Sc_{20}B_{5}C_{23}	
ScB_{15.5}CN	P3m1	a=5.568 c=10.756 Z=2		
ScB_{12.7}C_{0.62}Si_{0.08}	F43m	a=20.3085		
ScB_{12.9}C_{0.72}Si_{0.004}	Pbam	a=17.3040 b=16.0738 c=14.4829		
ScB_{11.5}C_{0.61}Si_{0.04}	P62m	a = 14.3055 c = 23.7477		
ScNi_{2}B_{2}C	I4/mmm	a=3.34 c=10.2 V=114		
Fe_{23}B_{3}C_{3}	cubic	a=10.62		
Sr_{3}Cl_{2}[CBN]	Pnma		yellow; carbidonitridoborate	
YBC		a = 3.38 b = 13.69 c = 3.62		
YB_{2}C	P4_{2}/mbc	a = 6.769 c = 7.430		
YB_{22}C_{3}	R3̅m	a=5.623 c=44.765 V=1226.9		
YB_{28.5}C	R3̅m	a=5.649 c=56.899 V=1572.7		
YB_{2}C_{2}	P4/mbm	a = 5.351 c = 3.561	melt > 2500 °C; Young's modulus = 207 GPa, shear modulus = 87 GPa, bulk modulus = 116 GPa; degrades in water or moist air; Superconductor Tc=1.0 K	
YB_{22}C_{2}N	R3̅m	a=5.623 c=44.785		
Y_{2}B_{3}C_{2}	Cmmm	a=0.3405 b=1.3765, c=0.3631 Z=2 V=170.2	Chain of B, with C branches	
Y_{5}B_{2}C_{5}	P4/ncc	a=8.1069 c=10.824 V=711.4	0D BC_{2} C	
Y_{5}B_{2}C_{6}	P4	a=8.068 c=11.668 v=7.595		
Y_{10.1}B_{7}C_{9.9}	C2/c	a=11.27 b = 11.16 c = 23.57 β = 98.15° Z=8	density 9.546; C-B-C and C-B-B-C	
Y_{15}B_{4}C_{14}			(C^{4−})_{6}(CBC^{5−})_{4}•e^{−}	
YB_{15.5}CN	P3̅m1	a=5.5919 c=10.873 Z=2		
Y_{2}B_{36}Si_{9}C	R3̅m	a=10.0344Å c=16.348 Z=6		
YNi_{2}B_{2}C	I4/mmm	a=3.525 c=10.536	superconductor Tc 15.6K	
Y_{2}NiBC_{2}				
Y_{5}Ni_{6}B_{6}C_{5}				
Y_{5}Ni_{8}B_{8}C_{5}				
Y_{16}I_{19}(C_{2}B_{2}C_{2})_{2}	P1̅	a=12.311 b=13.996 c=19.695 α=74.96° β=89.51° γ=67.03°		
Y_{21}I_{18}(CBC)_{7}	P1̅	a=10.660 b=15.546 c=18.41.6 α=82.49° β=85.01° γ=82.92°		
Nb_{3}B_{3}C	Cmcm	a = 3.2647 b=28.710 c=3.1285 Z=4	melt 2970 °C	
Nb_{4}B_{3}C_{2}	Cmcm	a =3.2287 b= 37.544 c = 3.1331	?	
Nb_{7}B_{4}C_{4}	Immm	a =3.15441 b=3.2166 c=32.260 Z=2	?	
Nb_{7}B_{6}C_{3}	Cmmm	a = 3.1341 b = 33.161 c = 3.2428 Z=2	?	
Mo_{2}BC	Cmcm	a=3.086 b=17.35 c=3.047 Z=4	superconductor Tc = 7.0 K; hard yet ductile	
YPd_{2}B_{2}C			superconductor Tc = 23 K	
YPd_{5}B_{3}C_{0.3}			superconductor Tc=23K	
YRh_{2}B_{2}C				
Ba_{21}[BN_{2}]_{11}[C_{2}]	I4̅	a = 15.3879 c = 10.0736 Z=2	nitridoborate acetylide	
LaBC	P2_{1}2_{1}2_{1}	a = 8.646 b = 8.691 c = 12.479		
LaB_{2}C_{2}	P4/mbm	a=3.816 c=3.975		
LaB_{2}C_{4}			2D	
LaB_{3}C_{3}	Pm3̅n	a =4.6712	C_{6}B_{6} forms truncated octahedron around La; semiconductor	
La_{4}B_{3}C_{12}				
La_{4}B_{5}C_{18}				
La_{5}B_{2}C_{6}	P4	a=8.5933 c=12.7098 V=938.56		
La_{5}B_{4}C_{4.85}	Pna2_{1}	a=24.657 b=8.605 c=8.6540 Z=4 V=1836.2	shiny black	
La_{10}B_{9}C_{6}				
La_{10}B_{9}C_{12}	P4_{1}2_{1}2	a=8.6678 c=25.689 Z=4 V=1927.1	shiny black plates; CCCBBCBCBBCCC CBCBBCBC 0D chains	
La_{15}B_{14}C_{19}	P2_{1}/c	a=8.640 b=8.636 c=19.823 β=94.28		
La_{3}BC_{2}H_{1.69}	Cmcm	a=3.804 b=12.744 c=11.240		
La_{3}BC_{2}F_{~0.71}	Cmcm	a =3.8189 b=12.982 c=11.3585		
La_{3}BC_{2}Cl_{~0.71}	Cmcm	a =3.8409 b =13.7068 c=11.2820		
La_{3}Cl_{2}(CBC)	Pnma	a=14.871 b=3.898 c=11.363		
La_{3}Cl_{3}BC	P2_{1}/m	a = 8.204 b = 3.8824 c = 11.328 β = 100.82◦ V=354.4 Z=2	metallic; chain of B with C branches	
LaNi_{2}B_{2}C	I4/mmm	a=3.793 c=9.824		
La_{3}Br_{2}(CBC)	Pnma	a=15.323 b=3.974 c=11.580		
La_{3}Br_{3}(BC)	P2_{1}/m	a=8.551 b=3.949 c=11.707 β=100.08		
La_{9}Br_{5}(CBC)_{3}	Pmmn	a=33.27 b=3.859 c=7.907	superconductor Tc=6K	
La_{4}I_{5}B_{2}C	C2/m	a=23.303 b=4.299 c=18.991 β=126.22°		
La_{9}I_{5}(CBC)_{3}	Pmmn	a=33.852 b=3.954 c=8.212		
CeBC	P2_{1}2_{1}2_{1}			
CeB_{2}C	R3̅m	a=6.6138 c=11.2594	2D 6 and 9 membered rings fused	
CeB_{2}C_{2}	P4/mbm	a=3.817 c=3.852		
Ce_{5}B_{2}C_{5}	P4/ncc	a=8.5708 c=11.004 v=808.3		
Ce_{5}B_{2}C_{6}	P4	a=8.3654 c=12.5217 v=875.9		
Ce_{5}B_{4}C_{5}	Pna2_{1}	a=24.426 b=8.463 c=8.5007 Z=8 V=1757	black	
Ce_{10}B_{8}C_{10}			0D B_{4}C_{4} B_{3}C_{3} BC_{2} C	
Ce_{10}B_{9}C_{12}	P4_{1}2_{1}2	a = 8.4785 c = 18.223 V = 1822.3 Å^{3} Z = 4	CCBCBCBCBCBCC^{9−} CBCBBCBC^{8−}	
Ce_{4}B_{2}C_{2}H_{2.42}	C2/m	a=12.895 b=3.7661 c=9.530 β=130.69°		
Ce_{4}B_{2}C_{2}F_{0.14}H_{2.26}	C2/m	a=12.792 b=3.7475 c=9.478 β=130.65°		
Ce_{3}BC_{2}F_{~0.71}	Cmcm	a=3.7267 b=12.4893 c=11.1777		
Ce_{3}Cl_{2}(CBC)	Pnma	a=14.690 3.836 c=11.260		
Ce_{3}Cl_{3}(BC)	P2_{1}/m	a=8.138 b=3.773 c=11.199		
Ce_{33}Fe_{13}B_{18}C_{34}	Im-3m	a = 14.246		
Ce_{10}Co_{2.64}B_{11.70}C_{10}	P1̅	a = 8.5131 b = 8.5144 c = 13.5709 α = 100.870° β = 93.677° γ = 90.041° Z = 2		
CeNi_{2}B_{2}C	I4/mmm	a=3.6378 c=10.227		
Ce_{3}Br_{2}(CBC)	Pnma	a=15.13.5 b=3.915 c=11.444		
Ce_{3}Br_{3}(BC)	P2_{1}/m	a=8.471 b=3.867 c=11.623 β=99.70°		
Ce_{9}Br_{5}(CBC)_{3}	Pmmn	a=32.935 b=3.804 c=7.816		
Ce_{6}Br_{3}(CB_{2}C)C	P2/m	a=8.601 b=3.829 c=10.224 β=112.51°		
Ce_{4}I_{5}B_{2}C	C2/m	a=23.194 b=4.290 c=18.822 β=126.50°		
CeRh_{2}B_{2}C	I4/mmm	a=3.843 c=10.176		
CePd_{2}B_{2}C	I4/mmm			
PrBC	P2_{1}2_{1}2_{1}	a = 8.4478 b = 8.4719 c = 12.325		
PrB_{2}C_{2}				
Pr_{2}BC	C2/m	a = 13.088 b = 3.6748 c = 9.488 β = 131.03°		
Pr_{5}B_{2}C_{5}	P4/ncc	a=8.522 c=10.995 v=798.5 a=8.448 c=10.970 Z=4 V=782.9	black	
Pr_{5}B_{2}C_{6}	P4	a=8.3954 c=12.248 v=863.3		
Pr_{5}B_{4}C_{5}	Pna2_{1}	a=24.592, b=8.4563 c=8.4918 Z=8	ferromagnetic < 12K; B_{4}C_{4}, B_{3}C_{3}, BC_{2} C	
Pr_{15}B_{6}C_{20}	P1̅	a=8.3431 b=9.2492 c=8.3581 α=84.72° β=89.68° γ =84.23 Z=1°	B_{2}C_{4} C_{3} C	
Pr_{10}B_{9}C_{12}	P4_{1}2_{1}2	a = 8.4365 c = 25.468 Z = 4		
Pr_{15}B_{6}C_{20}				
Pr_{25}B_{14}C_{26}	P2_{1}/c	a=4.243 b=8.4095 c=30.828 β=105.879° V=2100.6 Å^{3}		
Pr_{3}BC_{2}F_{0.71}	Cmcm	a=3.6928 b=12.287 c=11.1767		
PrCo_{2}B_{2}C	I4/mmm	a=3.6156 c=10.3507 V=135.31	superconductor Tc=6K	
PrNi_{2}B_{2}C	I4/mmm	a=3.7066 c=9.9993		
NdBC	P2_{1}2_{1}2_{1}	a = 8.370 b = 8.392 c = 12.253		
NdB_{2}C_{2}	P4/mbm	a=5.3823 c=3.7761 V=109.39		
Nd_{2}BC	C2/m	a = 12.732 b = 3.6848 c = 9.398 β = 130.43	[C=B-B=C]^{8–} · 4 e^{–}	
Nd_{5}B_{2}C_{5}	P4/ncc	a=8.4872 c=10.9591 V=789,4	0D BC_{2} C	
Nd_{5}B_{2}C_{6}	P4	a=8.3500 c=12.146 v=846.8		
Nd_{5}B_{4}C_{5}	Pna2_{1}	a=24.301 b=8.3126 c=8.3545 Z=8	ferromagnetic < 15K; B_{4}C_{4}, B_{3}C_{3}, BC_{2} C	
Nd_{10}B_{9}C_{12}	P4_{1}2_{1}2	a = 8.3834 c = 25.352 Z=4		
Nd_{15}B_{6}C_{20}	P1̅	a=8.284 b=9.228 c=8.309 α=84.74° β=89.68° γ=84.17° Z=1	B_{2}C_{4} C_{3} C	
Nd_{25}B_{12}C_{28}	P1̅	a=8.3209 b=8.3231 c=29.888 α=83.730° β=83.294° γ=89.764°	B_{2}C_{4} B_{3}C_{3} BC_{2} C	
Nd_{25}B_{14}C_{26}	P2_{1}/c	a=8.3404 b=8.3096 c=30.599 β=106.065° Z=2		
NdNi_{2}B_{2}C	I4/mmm	a=3.6780 c=10.0814		
SmBC	P2_{1}2_{1}2_{1}			
SmB_{2}C_{2}	P4/mbm	a=5.366 c=3.690 Z= V=106.26	density=6.126; 2D net of octahedrons and squares	
Sm_{5}B_{2}C_{5}	P4/ncc	a=8.331 c=10.926 V=758.3	0D BC_{2} C	
Sm_{5}B_{2}C_{6}	P4	a=8.2409 c=11.971 v=813.0		
SmNi_{2}B_{2}C	I4/mmm	a=3.6232 c=10.2437		
GdB_{2}C_{2}	P4/mbm	a = 5.3746 c = 3.6498	BC 2D-net of octagons and squares	
GdB_{2}C_{4}				
Gd_{2}B_{3}C_{2}	Cmmm	a=3.445 b=13.773 c=3.7107 Z=2	1D chain of B with side -C; water sensitive	
Gd_{4}B_{3}C_{3}				
Gd_{4}B_{3}C_{4}	P1̅	a = 3.637 b = 3.674 c = 11.859 α=93.34° β= 96.77 γ = 90.24 Z=1	black; (BC)_{∞} 1D C-B< chain and CBC 0D units	
Gd_{5}B_{2}C_{5}	P4/ncc	a=8.2455 c=10.8550 V=738.01	0D BC_{2} C	
Gd_{5}B_{2}C_{6}	P4	a=8.1493 c=11.799 v=7.836		
Gd_{9}B_{10}C_{6}				
Gd_{10}B_{7}C_{10}	C2/c		black; (BC)_{∞} 1D C-B< chain and CBC 0D units	
Gd_{15}B_{4}C_{14}			(C^{4−})_{6}(CBC^{5−})_{4}•e^{−}	
Gd_{2}B_{36}Si_{9}C	R3̅m	a=10.0955 c=16.454 Z=6		
GdCo_{2}B_{2}C	I4/mmm			
GdNiBC	P4/nmm	a=3.631 c=7.546		
GdNi_{2}B_{2}C	I4/mmm	a=3.588 c=10.392		
Gd_{4}Br_{3}(BC)C	P2_{1}/m	a=9.577 b=3.705 c=12.493 β=106.69°		
TbB_{2}C_{2}				
Tb_{2}B_{2}C_{3}	Cmmm	a = 3.412 b = 13.699 c = 3.669 V = 171.5Å^{3} , Z = 2		
Tb_{2}B_{4}C	Immm			
Tb_{4}B_{3}C_{4}	P1̅		black;	
Tb_{5}B_{2}C_{5}	P4/ncc	a=8.1382 c=10.861 V=719.4	0D BC_{2} C	
Tb_{5}B_{2}C_{6}	P4/ncc	a = 8.1114 c = 11.43		
Tb_{10}B_{7}C_{10}	C2/c	a=11.31 b=11.276 c=23.583 β=98.28°	black;	
Tb_{15}B_{4}C_{14}	P4/mnc	a=8.1251 c=15.861 Z=2	(C^{4−})_{6}(CBC^{5−})_{4}•e^{−}; ferromagnet <145K	
Tb_{1.8}C_{2}Si_{8}(B_{12})_{3}	R3̅m	a=10.1171 c=16.397, V=1453.4 Z=3	band gap 0.9 eV	
TbCo_{2}B_{2}C	I4/mmm			
TbNiBC	P4/nmm			
Tb_{4}Br_{3}(BC)C	P2_{1}/m			
DyB_{2}C	Pbam	a = 6.7893 b = 6.7776 c = 3.7254		
DyB_{2}C_{2}	P4/mbm	a=5.345 c=3.5600 Z=2		
Dy_{2}B_{2}C_{3}	Cmmm	a=3.396 b=13.694 c=3.627		
Dy_{2}B_{4}C	Immm	a=3.2772 b=6.567 c=7.542 Z=2		
Dy_{4}B_{3}C_{4}	P1̅	a=11.387 b=3.5999 c=11.739 α=93.23° β=96.74 °C=90.16°	black;	
Dy_{5}B_{2}C_{5}	P4/ncc	a=8.0869 c=10.838 V=708.8	0D BC_{2} C	
Dy_{5}B_{2}C_{6}	P4	a=8.0512 c=11.499 v=745.4		
Dy_{10}B_{7}C_{10}	C2/c	a=11.387 b=11.147 c=23.715 β=98.06°	black;	
Dy_{15}B_{4}C_{14}	P4/mnc	a=8.0882 c=15.884	(C^{4−})_{6}(CBC^{5−})_{4}•e^{−}; ferromagnet <120K	
Dy_{2}B_{36}Si_{9}C	R3̅m	a=10.0735 c=16.323 Z=6		
DyCo_{2}B_{2}C	I4/mmm			
DyNiBC	P4/nmm			
DyNi_{2}B_{2}C	I4/mmm	a=3.542 c=10.501	T_{c}=3.8 K	
HoBC	Cmmm	a = 3.384 b = 13.697 c = 3.594		
HoBC	tetragonal	a = 3.546 c = 46.40		
HoB_{2}C	P4_{2}/mbc	a = 6.773 c =7.399		
HoB_{2}C_{2}	P4̅2c	a = 3.780 c = 7.074		
HoB_{22}C_{3}	R3̅m	a=5.614 c=44.625 V=1248.4		
HoB_{28.5}C	R3̅m	a=5.638 c=56.881 V=1566.0		
Ho_{2}BC_{3}	tetragonal	a = 3.561 c = 12.455	high temperature	
Ho_{2}BC_{3}	tetragonal	a =3.567 c = 24.514(8	1500°	
Ho_{2}B_{4}C	Immm			
Ho_{4}B_{3}C_{4}	P1̅		black;	
Ho_{5}B_{2}C_{5}	P4/ncc	a=8.0355 c=10.827 V=699.1	magnetocaloric	
Ho_{5}B_{2}C_{6}	P4	a=7.986 c=11.556 v=7.369		
Ho_{10}B_{7}C_{10}	C2/c		black;	
Ho_{15}B_{2}C_{17}		a = 8.004 c = 15.984(4		
Ho_{15}B_{4}C_{14}			(C^{4−})_{6}(CBC^{5−})_{4}•e^{−}	
HoB_{15.5}CN	P3̅m1	a=5.5883 c=10.878 Z=2		
HoB_{22}C_{2}N	R3̅m	a=5.614 c=44.625 V=1248.4	spin glass <22.5K	
Ho_{2}B_{36}Si_{9}C	R3̅m	a=10.0643 c=16.2699 Z=6		
HoCo_{2}⁢B_{2}⁢C	I4/mmm	𝑎 =3.500 𝑐 =10.590	non-superconductor	
HoNiBC	P4/nmm	a=3.3.5261 c=7.556 V=95.9 Z=2		
HoNi_{2}B_{2}C	I4/mmm	a=3.515 c=10.518	T_{c}=7.8 K	
HoNiBC	P4/nmm	a=3.563 c=7.546		
ErB_{2}C	P42/mbc	a=6.77 c=7.33 V=335.71		
ErB_{2}C_{2}	P4/mbm			
ErB_{22}C_{3}	R3̅m	a=5.624 c=44.681 V=1224.9		
ErB_{28.5}C	R3̅m	a=5.640 c=56.868 V=1566.5		
Er_{2}B_{4}C	Immm			
Er_{4}B_{3}C_{4}	P1̅		black;	
Er_{5}B_{2}C_{5}	P4/ncc	a=7.9892 c=10.740 V=685.5	0D BC_{2} C	
Er_{5}B_{2}C_{6}	P4	a=7.948 c=11.300 v=714		
Er_{10}B_{7}C_{10}	C2/c		black;	
Er_{15}B_{4}C_{14}	P4/mnc	a=7.932 c=15.685 Z=2	(C^{4−})_{6}(CBC^{5−})_{4}•e^{−}; ferromagnet <50K	
ErB_{22}C_{2}N	R3̅m		spin glass <5K	
ErB_{15.5}CN	P3̅m1	a=5.5889 c=10.880 Z=2		
Er_{2}B_{36}Si_{9}C	R3̅m	a=10.016 c=16.309 Z=6		
ErNiBC	P4/nmm		ferromagnetic	
ErNi_{2}B_{2}C	I4/mmm	a=3.500 c=10.533		
TmB_{2}C	P4_{2}/mbc		antiferromagnetic < 12K	
TmB_{2}C_{2}	P4/mbm	a=3.776 c=3.477		
TmB_{22}C_{3}	R3̅m	a=5.631 c=44.737 V=1228.7		
TmB_{28.5}C	R3̅m	a=4 5.622 c=56.649 V=1550.9		
Tm_{4}B_{3}C_{4}	P1̅		black;	
Tm_{5}B_{2}C_{5}	P4/ncc	a=7.9299 c=10.810 V=679.8	0D BC_{2} C	
Tm_{5}B_{2}C_{6}	P4	a=7.888 c=11.337 v=705.4		
Tm_{15}B_{4}C_{14}			(C^{4−})_{6}(CBC^{5−})_{4}•e^{−}	
TmB_{15.5}CN	P3̅m1	a=5.580 c=10.850 Z=2		
TmB_{22}C_{2}N	R3̅m			
Tm_{2}B_{36}Si_{9}C	R3̅m	a=10.0156Å c=16.296 Z=6		
TmNi_{2}B_{2}C	I4/mmm	a=3.494 c=10.613(		
YbB_{2}C_{2}		a=3.775 c=3.552	hydrolised to C, YbB_{6}, Yb_{3}(OH)_{3n}(BO_{3})_{(3-n)} CO_{2} CO hydrocarbons H_{2}	
Yb_{4}B_{3}C_{4}	P1̅		black;	
Yb_{5}B_{2}C_{5}	P4/ncc	a = 7.872 c = 10.774		
Yb_{15}B_{4}C_{14}	P4/mnc	a = 7.8601, c = 15.504	(C^{4−})_{6}(CBC^{5−})_{4}•e^{−}	
Yb_{2}B_{36}Si_{9}C	R3̅m	a=10.1103Å b=16.314 Z=6		
YbNiBC	P4/nmm	a=3.503 c=7.556		
YbNi_{2}B_{2}C	I4/mmm	a=3.4782 10.607		
LuB_{2}C	P4_{2}/mbc	a=6.7546 c=7.1781		
LuB_{2}C	Pbam	a=6.7429 b=6.7341 c=3.5890 Z=4		
LuB_{2}C_{2}	P4/mbm	a=3.762 c=3.453		
LuB_{22}C_{3}	R3̅m	a=5.595 c=44.464 V=1205.7		
Lu_{3}BC_{3}	Cmcm	a = 4.9788 b = 5.0109 c = 15.669 Z = 4	CBC and C	
Lu_{4}B_{3}C_{4}	P1̅	a=3.4198 b=3.474 c=11.73 α=92.63° β=96.22° γ=89.99°	black;	
Lu_{15}B_{4}C_{14}			(C^{4−})_{6}(CBC^{5−})_{4}•e^{−}	
LuB_{15.5}CN	P3̅m1	a=5.5771 c=10.839 Z=2		
LuB_{22}C_{2}N	R3̅m			
LuNiBC	P4/nmm	a=3.4985 c=7.7556 Z=2		
LuNi_{2}B_{2}C	I4/mmm	a=3.462 c=10.629	suerconductor Tc 16.6K	
Lu_{2}NiBC_{2}				
Mo_{0.9}W_{1.1}BC		a=3.07472 b=17.2955 c=3.04001 @330Mpa	Vickers Hardness = 42 Gpa (superhard)	
CeIr_{2}B_{2}C	I4/mmm	a=3.849 c=10.357		
YPt_{2}B_{2}C	I4/mmm		superconductor Tc=10 K	
LaPt_{2}B_{2}C	I4/mmm	a = 3.8681 c = 10.705 Z=2	superconductor Tc=10K	
CePt_{2}B_{2}C	I4/mmm			
PrPt_{2}B_{2}C	I4/mmm	a=3.8373 c=10.7610 V=158.45	superconductor Tc=6K	
NdPt_{2}B_{2}C	I4/mmm	a=3.826 c= 10.732	superconductor Tc=1.6K	
ThBC	P4_{1}22	a = 3.762 c = 25.246 Z = 8.	melt 2101°	
ThB_{2}C	R3̅m	a=6.676 c=11.376 Z=9 V=439.1	2D; melt 2040°	
Th_{2}B_{2}C_{3}	Pnnm	a = 13.0655 b = 3.9757 c = 3.6507		
Th_{3}B_{2}C_{3}	P2/m	a=3.703 b=9.146 c=3.773 γ=100.06°		
Th_{2}ScB_{6}C_{3}	P6/mmm	a = 0.660296 c = 0.35842		
ThNiBC	tetragonal	c/a=1.98	superconductor T_{c} = 0.7 K	
ThNi_{2}B_{2}C				
UBC	Cmcm	a=3.591 b=11.95 c=3.372	melt 2144°	
α-UB_{2}C	Pmma	a = 6.0338 b = 3.5177 c = 4.1067 V = 87.2 Z = 2.	2D; formed below 1675 °C	
β-UB_{2}C	R3̅m		melt 2280°	
UB_{0.78}C_{1.22}	Cmcm	a = 3.5752 b = 11.8584 c = 3.3881	1D 1/_{∞}-[B_{2}C_{2}]	
U_{5}B_{2}C_{7}	tetragonal	a = 7.84 c = 23.58		
U_{2}ScB_{6}C_{3}	P6/mmm	a = 6.5096 c = 3.4265	ferromagnet T_{C} = 61 K	
NpBC	Cmcm	a=3.5913 b=12.0566 c=3.3803		
NpB_{2}C	R3̅m	a=6.536 c=10.752 Z=9		
PuBC	Cmcm	a=3.5890 b=12.0210 c=3.3910		
PuB_{2}C	R3̅m	a=6.5104 c=10.7966 Z=9		
