= Superhard material =

Material with Vickers hardness exceeding 40 gigapascals

A superhard material is a material with a hardness value exceeding 40 gigapascals (GPa) when measured by the Vickers hardness test. They are virtually incompressible solids with high electron density and high bond covalency. As a result of their unique properties, these materials are of great interest in many industrial areas including abrasives, polishing and cutting tools, disc brakes, and wear-resistant and protective coatings.

Diamond is the hardest known material to date, with a Vickers hardness in the range of 70–150 GPa. Diamond demonstrates both high thermal conductivity and electrically insulating properties, and much attention has been put into finding practical applications of this material. However, diamond has several limitations for mass industrial application, including its high cost and oxidation at temperatures above 800 °C. In addition, diamond dissolves in iron and forms iron carbides at high temperatures and therefore is inefficient in cutting ferrous materials including steel. Therefore, recent research of superhard materials has been focusing on compounds which would be thermally and chemically more stable than pure diamond.

The search for new superhard materials has generally taken two paths. In the first approach, researchers emulate the short, directional covalent carbon bonds of diamond by combining light elements like boron, carbon, nitrogen, and oxygen. This approach became popular in the late 1980s with the exploration of C_{3}N_{4} and B-C-N ternary compounds. The second approach towards designing superhard materials incorporates these lighter elements (B, C, N, and O), but also introduces transition metals with high valence electron densities to provide high incompressibility. In this way, metals with high bulk moduli but low hardness are coordinated with small covalent-forming atoms to produce superhard materials. Tungsten carbide is an industrially-relevant manifestation of this approach, although it is not considered superhard. Alternatively, borides combined with transition metals have become a rich area of superhard research and have led to discoveries such as ReB_{2}, OsB_{2}, and WB_{4}.

Superhard materials can be generally classified into two categories: intrinsic compounds and extrinsic compounds. The intrinsic group includes diamond, cubic boron nitride (c-BN), carbon nitrides, and ternary compounds such as B-N-C, which possess an innate hardness. Conversely, extrinsic materials are those that have superhardness and other mechanical properties that are determined by their microstructure rather than composition. An example of extrinsic superhard material is nanocrystalline diamond known as aggregated diamond nanorods.

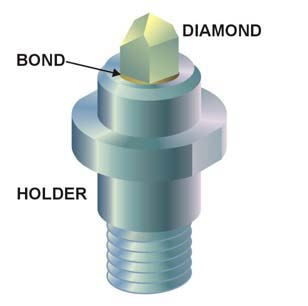
A nanoindenter, used to measure the hardness and related properties of materials

== Definition and mechanics of hardness ==
Vickers test scheme

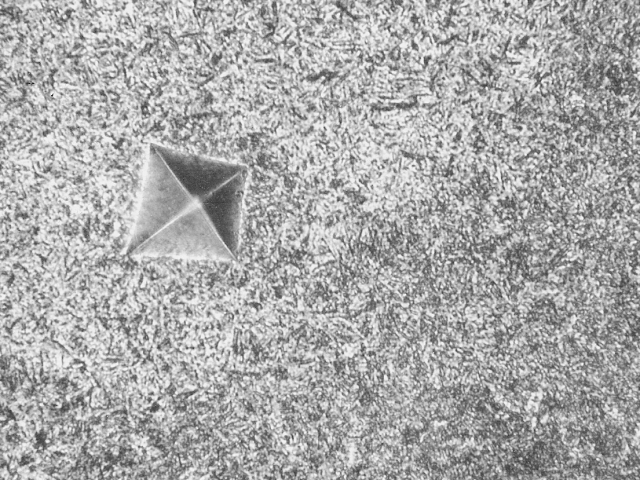
An indentation left in case-hardened steel after a Vickers hardness test

The hardness of a material is directly related to its incompressibility, elasticity and resistance to change in shape. A superhard material has high shear modulus, high bulk modulus, and does not deform plastically. Ideally superhard materials should have a defect-free, isotropic lattice. This greatly reduces structural deformations that can lower the strength of the material. However, defects can actually strengthen some covalent structures. Traditionally, high-pressure and high-temperature (HPHT) conditions have been used to synthesize superhard materials, but recent superhard material syntheses aim at using less energy and lower cost materials.

Historically, hardness was first defined as the ability of one material to scratch another and quantified by an integer (sometimes half-integer) from 0 to 10 on the Mohs scale. This scale was however quickly found too discrete and non-linear. Measuring the mechanical hardness of materials changed to using a nanoindenter (usually made of diamond) and evaluating bulk moduli, and the Brinell, Rockwell, Knoop, and Vickers scales have been developed. Whereas the Vickers scale is widely accepted as a most common test, there remain controversies on the weight load to be applied during the test. This is because Vickers hardness values are load-dependent. An indent made with 0.5N will indicate a higher hardness value than an indent made with 50N. This phenomenon is known as the indentation size effect (ISE). Thus, hardness values are not meaningful unless the load is also reported. Some argue that hardness values should consistently be reported in the asymptotic (high-load region), as this is a more standardized representation of a material's hardness.

Vickers hardness of selected hard and superhard materials
Material	Vickers hardness (GPa)	Bulk Modulus (GPa)
Diamond	115	440
c-BC_{2}N	76	282
c-BC_{5}	71	
γ-Boron	58	227
c-BN	48, 62	400
OsB_{2}	37	395
B_{4}C	35, 38	
WB_{4}	~30	
AlMgB_{14}	26.7	
ReB_{2}	~20	

Bulk moduli, shear moduli, and elasticity are the key factors in the superhard classification process. The incompressibility of a material is quantified by the bulk modulus B, which measures the resistance of a solid to volume compression under hydrostatic stress as B = −Vdp/dV. Here V is the volume, p is pressure, and dp/dV is the partial derivative of pressure with respect to the volume. The bulk modulus test uses an indenter tool to form a permanent deformation in a material. The size of the deformation depends on the material's resistance to the volume compression made by the tool. Elements with small molar volumes and strong interatomic forces usually have high bulk moduli. Bulk moduli was the first major test of hardness and originally shown to be correlated with the molar volume (V_{m}) and cohesive energy (E_{c}) as B ~ E_{c}/V_{m}.

Bulk modulus was believed to be a direct measure of a material's hardness but this no longer remains the dominant school of thought. For example, some alkali and noble metals (Pd, Ag) have anomalously high ratio of the bulk modulus to the Vickers or Brinell hardness. In the early 2000s, a direct relationship between bulk modulus and valence electron density was found as the more electrons were present the greater the repulsions within the structure were. Bulk modulus is still used as a preliminary measure of a material as superhard but it is now known that other properties must be taken into account.

In contrast to bulk modulus, shear modulus measures the resistance to shape change at a constant volume, taking into account the crystalline plane and direction of shear. The shear modulus G is defined as ratio of shear stress to shear strain: G = stress/strain = F·L/(A·dx), where F is the applied force, A is the area upon which the force acts, dx is the resulting displacement and L is the initial length. The larger the shear modulus, the greater the ability for a material to resist shearing forces. Therefore, the shear modulus is a measure of rigidity. Shear modulus is related to bulk modulus as 3/G = 2B(1 − 2v)(1 + v), where v is the Poisson's ratio, which is typically ~0.1 in covalent materials. If a material contains highly directional bonds, the shear modulus will increase and give a low Poisson ratio.

A material is also considered hard if it resists plastic deformation. If a material has short covalent bonds, atomic dislocations that lead to plastic deformation are less likely to occur than in materials with longer, delocalized bonds. If a material contains many delocalized bonds it is likely to be soft. Somewhat related to hardness is another mechanical property fracture toughness, which is a material's ability to resist breakage from forceful impact (note that this concept is distinct from the notion of toughness). A superhard material is not necessarily "supertough". For example, the fracture toughness of diamond is about 7–10 MPa·m^{1/2}, which is high compared to other gemstones and ceramic materials, but poor compared to many metals and alloys – common steels and aluminium alloys have the toughness values at least 5 times higher.

Several properties must be taken into account when evaluating a material as (super)hard. While hard materials have high bulk moduli, a high bulk modulus does not mean a material is hard. Inelastic characteristics must be considered as well, and shear modulus might even provide a better correlation with hardness than bulk modulus. Covalent materials generally have high bond-bending force constants and high shear moduli and are more likely to give superhard structures than, for example, ionic solids.

== Diamond ==
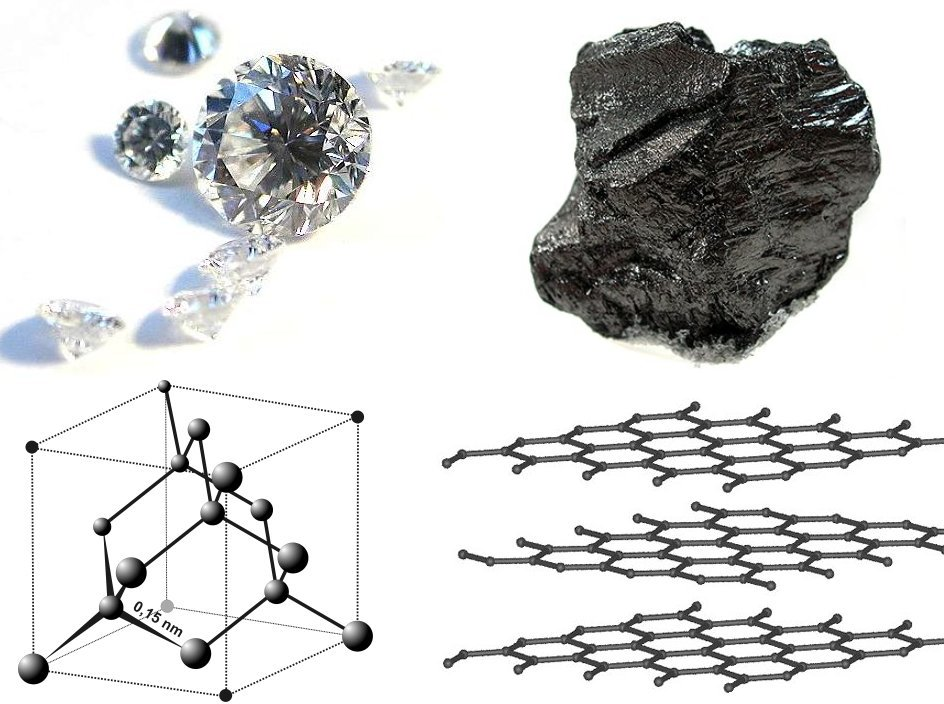
Diamond and graphite materials and structure

Diamond is an allotrope of carbon where the atoms are arranged in a modified version of face-centered cubic (fcc) structure known as "diamond cubic". It is known for its hardness (see table above) and incompressibility and is targeted for some potential optical and electrical applications. The properties of individual natural diamonds or carbonado vary too widely for industrial purposes, and therefore synthetic diamond became a major research focus.

=== Synthetic diamond ===
The high-pressure synthesis of diamond in 1953 in Sweden and in 1954 in the US, made possible by the development of new apparatus and techniques, became a milestone in synthesis of artificial superhard materials. The synthesis clearly showed the potential of high-pressure applications for industrial purposes and stimulated growing interest in the field. Four years after the first synthesis of artificial diamond, cubic boron nitride c-BN was obtained and found to be the second hardest solid.

Synthetic diamond can exist as a single, continuous crystal or as small polycrystals interconnected through the grain boundaries. The inherent spatial separation of these subunits causes the formation of grains, which are visible by the unaided eye due to the light absorption and scattering properties of the material.

The hardness of synthetic diamond (70–150 GPa) is very dependent on the relative purity of the crystal itself. The more perfect the crystal structure, the harder the diamond becomes. It has been reported that HPHT single crystals and nanocrystalline diamond aggregates (aggregated diamond nanorods) can be harder than natural diamond.

Historically, it was thought that synthetic diamond should be structurally perfect to be useful. This is because diamond was mainly preferred for its aesthetic qualities, and small flaws in structure and composition were visible by naked eye. Although this is true, the properties associated with these small changes has led to interesting new potential applications of synthetic diamond. For example, nitrogen doping can enhance mechanical strength of diamond, and heavy doping with boron (several atomic percent) makes it a superconductor.

In 2014, researchers reported on the synthesis of nano-twinned diamond with Vickers hardness values up to 200 GPa. The authors attribute the unprecedented hardness to the Hall-Petch effect, which predicts that smaller microstructural features can lead to enhanced hardness due to higher density of boundaries that stop dislocations. They achieve twins with an average thickness of 5 nm using a precursor of onion carbon nanoparticles subjected to high temperature and pressure. They also simultaneously achieve an oxidation temperature that is 200 °C higher than that of natural diamond. Higher thermal stability is relevant to industrial applications such as cutting tools, where high temperatures can lead to rapid diamond degradation.

=== Dense Amorphous Carbon ===
A dense AM-III form of transparent amorphous carbon has a Vickers hardness of 113 GPa. This heat-treated fullerene is currently the hardest amorphous material.

== Cubic boron nitride ==
=== History ===
Cubic boron nitride or c-BN was first synthesized in 1957 by Robert H. Wentorf at General Electric, shortly after the synthesis of diamond. The general process for c-BN synthesis is the dissolution of hexagonal boron nitride (h-BN) in a solvent-catalyst, usually alkali or alkaline earth metals or their nitrides, followed by spontaneous nucleation of c-BN under high pressure, high temperature (HPHT) conditions. The yield of c-BN is lower and substantially slower compared to diamond's synthetic route due to the complicated intermediate steps. Its insolubility in iron and other metal alloys makes it more useful for some industrial applications than diamond.

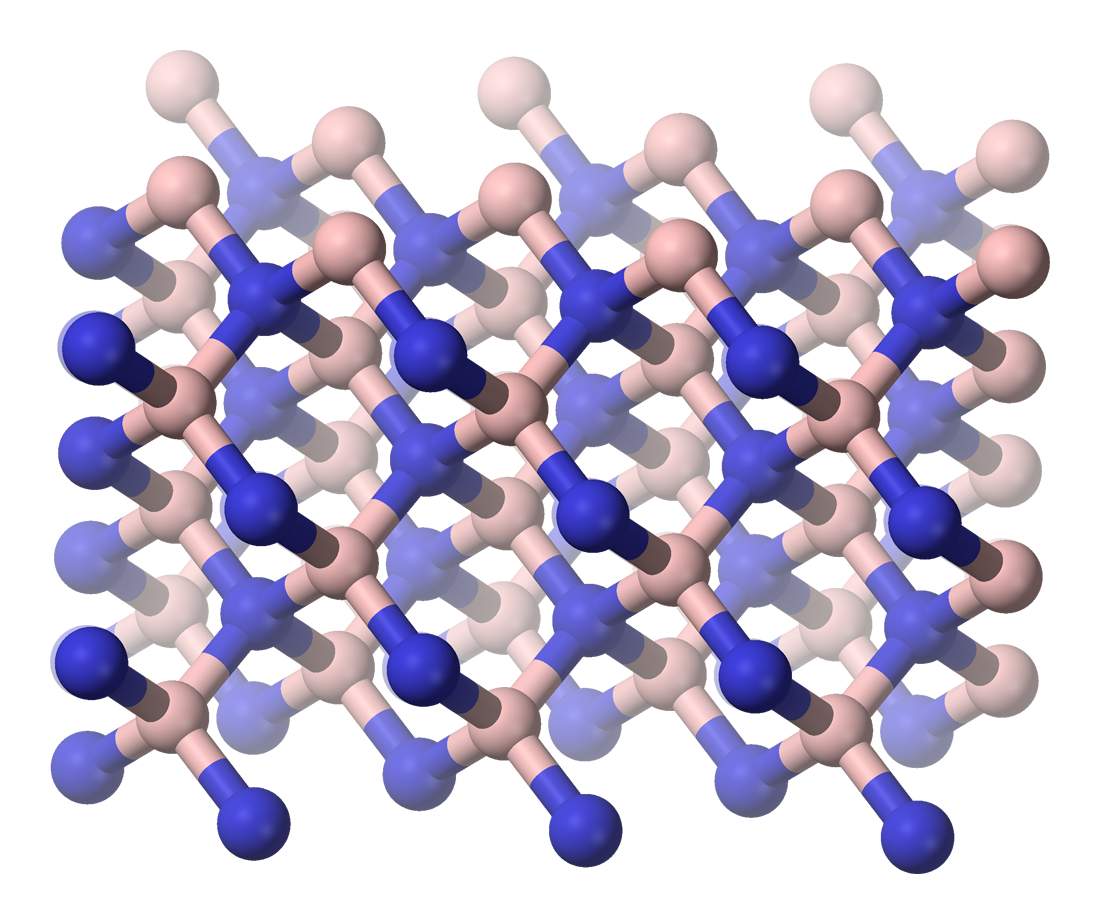
Sphalerite BN structure

Pure cubic boron nitride is transparent or slightly amber. Different colors can be produced depending on defects or an excess of boron (less than 1%). Defects can be produced by doping solvent-catalysts (i.e. Li, Ca, or Mg nitrides) with Al, B, Ti, or Si. This induces a change in the morphology and color of c-BN crystals. The result is darker and larger (500 μm) crystals with better shapes and a higher yield.

=== Structure and properties ===
Cubic boron nitride adopts a sphalerite crystal structure, which can be constructed by replacing every two carbon atoms in diamond with one boron atom and one nitrogen atom. The short B-N (1.57 Å) bond is close to the diamond C-C bond length (1.54 Å), that results in strong covalent bonding between atoms in the same fashion as in diamond. The slight decrease in covalency for B-N bonds compared to C-C bonds reduces the hardness from ~100 GPa for diamond down to 48 GPa in c-BN. As diamond is less stable than graphite, c-BN is less stable than h-BN, but the conversion rate between those forms is negligible at room temperature.

Cubic boron nitride is insoluble in iron, nickel, and related alloys at high temperatures, but it binds well with metals due to formation of interlayers of metal borides and nitrides. It is also insoluble in most acids, but is soluble in alkaline molten salts and nitrides, such as LiOH, KOH, NaOH/Na_{2}CO_{3}, NaNO_{3} which are used to etch c-BN. Because of its stability with heat and metals, c-BN surpasses diamond in mechanical applications. The thermal conductivity of BN is among the highest of all electric insulators. In addition, c-BN consists of only light elements and has low X-ray absorptivity, capable of reducing the X-ray absorption background.

=== Research and development ===
Due to its great chemical and mechanical robustness, c-BN has widespread application as an abrasive, such as on cutting tools and scratch resistant surfaces. Cubic boron nitride is also highly transparent to X-rays. This, along with its high strength, makes it possible to have very thin coatings of c-BN on structures that can be inspected using X-rays. Several hundred tonnes of c-BN are produced worldwide each year. By modification, Borazon, an American brand name of c-BN, is used in industrial applications to shape tools, as it can withstand temperatures greater than 2,000 °C. Cubic boron nitride-coated grinding wheels, referred to as Borazon wheels, are routinely used in the machining of hard ferrous metals, cast irons, and nickel-base and cobalt-base superalloys. Other brand names, such as Elbor and Cubonite, are marketed by Russian vendors.

New approaches in research focus on improving c-BN pressure capabilities of the devices used for c-BN synthesis. At present, the capabilities for the production of c-BN are restricted to pressures of about 6 GPa. Increasing the pressure limit will permit synthesis of larger single crystals than from the present catalytic synthesis. However, the use of solvents under supercritical conditions for c-BN synthesis has been shown to reduce pressure requirements. The high cost of c-BN still limits its application, which motivates the search for other superhard materials.

== Carbon nitride ==
The structure of beta carbon nitride (β-C_{3}N_{4}) was first proposed by Amy Liu and Marvin Cohen in 1989. It is isostructural with Si_{3}N_{4} and was predicted to be harder than diamond. The calculated bond length was 1.47 Å, 5% shorter than the C-C bond length in diamond. Later calculations indicated that the shear modulus is 60% of that of diamond, and carbon nitride is less hard than c-BN.

Despite two decades of pursuit of this compound, no synthetic sample of C_{3}N_{4} has validated the hardness predictions; this has been attributed to the difficulty in synthesis and the instability of C_{3}N_{4}. Carbon nitride is only stable at a pressure that is higher than that of the graphite-to-diamond transformation. The synthesis conditions would require extremely high pressures because carbon is four- and sixfold coordinated. In addition, C_{3}N_{4} would pose problems of carbide formation if they were to be used to machine ferrous metals. Although publications have reported preparation of C_{3}N_{4} at lower pressures than stated, synthetic C_{3}N_{4} was not proved superhard.

== Boron carbon nitride ==
The similar atomic sizes of boron, carbon and nitrogen, as well as the similar structures of carbon and boron nitride polymorphs, suggest that it might be possible to synthesize diamond-like phase containing all three elements. It is also possible to make compounds containing B-C-O, B-O-N, or B-C-O-N under high pressure, but their synthesis would expect to require a complex chemistry and in addition, their elastic properties would be inferior to that of diamond.

Beginning in 1990, a great interest has been put in studying the possibility to synthesize dense B-C-N phases. They are expected to be thermally and chemically more stable than diamond, and harder than c-BN, and would therefore be excellent materials for high speed cutting and polishing of ferrous alloys. These characteristic properties are attributed to the diamond-like structure combined with the sp3 σ-bonds among carbon and the heteroatoms. BC_{x}N_{y} thin films were synthesized by chemical vapor deposition in 1972. However, data on the attempted synthesis of B-C-N dense phases reported by different authors have been contradictory. It is unclear whether the synthesis products are diamond-like solid solutions between carbon and boron nitride or just mechanical mixtures of highly dispersed diamond and c-BN. In 2001, a diamond-like-structured c-BC_{2}N was synthesized at pressures >18 GPa and temperatures >2,200 K by a direct solid-state phase transition of graphite-like (BN)_{0.48}C_{0.52}. The reported Vickers and Knoop hardnesses were intermediate between diamond and c-BN, making the new phase the second hardest known material. Ternary B–C–N phases can also be made using shock-compression synthesis. It was further suggested to extend the B–C–N system to quaternary compounds with silicon included.

== Metal borides ==
Unlike carbon-based systems, metal borides can be easily synthesized in large quantities under ambient conditions, an important technological advantage. Most metal borides are hard; however, a few stand out among them for their particularly high hardnesses (for example, WB_{4}, RuB_{2}, OsB_{2} and ReB_{2}). These metal borides are still metals and not semiconductors or insulators (as indicated by their high electronic density of states at the Fermi Level); however, the additional covalent B-B and M-B bonding (M = metal) lead to high hardness. Dense heavy metals, such as osmium, rhenium, tungsten etc., are particularly apt at forming hard borides because of their high electron densities, small atomic radii, high bulk moduli, and ability to bond strongly with boron.

=== Osmium diboride ===
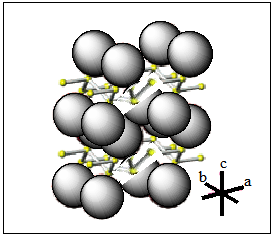
Crystal structure of OsB_{2}

Osmium diboride (OsB_{2}) has a high bulk modulus of 395 GPa and therefore is considered as a candidate superhard material, but the maximum achieved Vickers hardness is 37 GPa, slightly below the 40 GPa limit of superhardness. A common way to synthesize OsB_{2} is by a solid-state metathesis reaction containing a 2:3 mixture of OsCl_{3}:MgB_{2}. After the MgCl_{2} product is washed away, X-ray diffraction indicates products of OsB_{2}, OsB and Os. Heating this product at 1,000 °C for three days produces pure OsB_{2} crystalline product. OsB_{2} has an orthorhombic structure (space group Pmmn) with two planes of osmium atoms separated by a non-planar layer of hexagonally coordinated boron atoms; the lattice parameters are a = 4.684 Å, b = 2.872 Å and c = 4.096 Å. The b direction of the crystal is the most compressible and the c direction is the least compressible. This can be explained by the orthorhombic structure. When looking at the boron and osmium atoms in the a and b directions, they are arranged in a way that is offset from one another. Therefore, when they are compressed they are not pushed right up against one another. Electrostatic repulsion is the force that maximizes the materials incompressibility and so in this case the electrostatic repulsion is not taken full advantage of. When compressed in the c direction, the osmium and boron atoms are almost directly in line with one another and the electrostatic repulsion is therefore high, causing direction c to be the least compressible. This model implies that if boron is more evenly distributed throughout the lattice then incompressibility could be higher. Electron backscatter diffraction coupled with hardness measurements reveals that in the (010) plane, the crystal is 54% harder in the <100> than <001> direction. This is seen by looking at how long the indentation is along a certain direction (related to the indentations made with a Vickers hardness test). Along with the alignment of the atoms, this is also due to the short covalent B-B (1.80 Å) bonds in the <100> direction, which are absent in the <001> direction (B-B = 4.10 Å).

=== Rhenium borides ===
Rhenium was targeted as a candidate for superhard metal borides because of its desirable physical and chemical characteristics. It has a high electron density, a small atomic radius and a high bulk modulus. When combined with boron, it makes a crystal with highly covalent bonding allowing it to be incompressible and potentially very hard. A wide array of rhenium borides have been investigated including Re_{3}B, Re_{7}B_{3}, Re_{2}B, ReB, Re_{2}B_{3}, Re_{3}B_{7}, Re_{2}B_{5}, ReB_{3} and ReB_{2}. Each of these materials has their own set of properties and characteristics. Some show promise as superconductors and some have unique elastic and electronic properties, but the most relevant to superhard materials is ReB_{2}.

Rhenium diboride (ReB_{2}) is a refractory compound which was first synthesized in the 1960s, using arc melting, zone melting, or optical floating zone furnaces. An example synthesis of this material is the flux method, which is conducted by placing rhenium metal and amorphous boron in an alumina crucible with excess aluminium. This can be run with a ratio of 1:2:50 for Re:B:Al, with the excess aluminium as a growth medium. The crucible is placed in an alumina tube, inserted into a resistively heated furnace with flowing argon gas and sintered at 1,400 °C for several hours. After cooling, the aluminium is dissolved in NaOH. Each ReB_{2} synthesis route has its own drawbacks, and this one gives small inclusions of aluminium incorporated into the crystal lattice.

Rhenium diboride has a very high melting point approaching 2,400 °C and a highly anisotropic, layered crystal structure. Its symmetry is either hexagonal (space group P6_{3}mc) or orthorhombic (Cmcm) depending on the phase. There, close-packed Re layers alternate with puckered triangular boron layers along the (001) plane. This can be seen above on the example of osmium diboride. The density of states for ReB_{2} has one of the lowest values among the metal borides, indicating strong covalent bonding and high hardness.

Owing to the anisotropic nature of this material, the hardness depends on the crystal orientation. The (002) plane contains the most covalent character and exhibits a maximum Vickers hardness value of 40.5 GPa, while the perpendicular planes were 6% lower at 38.1 GPa. These values decrease with increased load, settling at around 28 GPa each. The nanoindentation values were found to be 36.4 GPa and 34.0 GPa for the (002) and perpendicular planes respectively. The hardness values depend on the material purity and composition – the more boron the harder the boride – and the above values are for a Re:B ratio of approximately 1.00:1.85. Rhenium diboride also has a reported bulk modulus of 383 GPa and a shear modulus of 273 GPa. The hardness of rhenium diboride, and most other materials also depends on the load during the test. The above values of about 40 GPa were all measured with an effective load of 0.5–1 N. At such low load, the hardness values are also overestimated for other materials, for example it exceeds 100 GPa for c-BN. Other researchers, while having reproduced the high ReB_{2} hardness at low load, reported much lower values of 19–17 GPa at a more conventional load of 3–49 N, that makes ReB_{2} a hard, but not a superhard material.

Rhenium diboride exhibits metallic conductivity which increases as temperature decreases and can be explained by a nonzero density of states due to the d and p overlap of rhenium and boron respectively. At this point, it is the only superhard material with metallic behavior. The material also exhibits relatively high thermal stability. Depending on the heating method, it will maintain its mass up to temperatures of 600–800 °C, with any drop being due to loss of absorbed water. A small loss of mass can then be seen at temperatures approaching 1,000 °C. It performs better when a slower heat ramp is utilized. Part of this small drop at around 1,000 °C was explained by the formation of a dull B_{2}O_{3} coating on the surface as boron is leached out of the solid, which serves as a protective coating, thereby reducing additional boron loss. This can be easily dissolved by methanol to restore the material to it native shiny state.

=== Tungsten borides ===
The discovery of superhard tungsten tetraboride is further evidence for the promising design approach of covalently bonding incompressible transition metals with boron. While WB_{4} was first synthesized and identified as the highest boride of tungsten in 1966, it was only recognized as an inexpensive superhard material in 2011.

Interestingly, lower borides of tungsten such as tungsten diboride are not superhard. Higher boron content leads to higher hardness because of the increased density of short, covalent boron-boron and boron-metal bonds. However, researchers have been able to push WB_{2} into the superhard regime through minority additions of other transition metals such as niobium and tantalum in the crystal structure. This mechanism of hardness enhancement is called solid solution strengthening and arises because atoms of different sizes are incorporated into the parent lattice to impede dislocation motion.

=== Aluminium magnesium boride ===
Aluminium magnesium boride or BAM is a chemical compound of aluminium, magnesium and boron. Whereas its nominal formula is AlMgB_{14}, the chemical composition is closer to Al_{0.75}Mg_{0.75}B_{14}. It is a ceramic alloy that is highly resistive to wear and has a low coefficient of sliding friction.

== Other boron-rich superhard materials ==
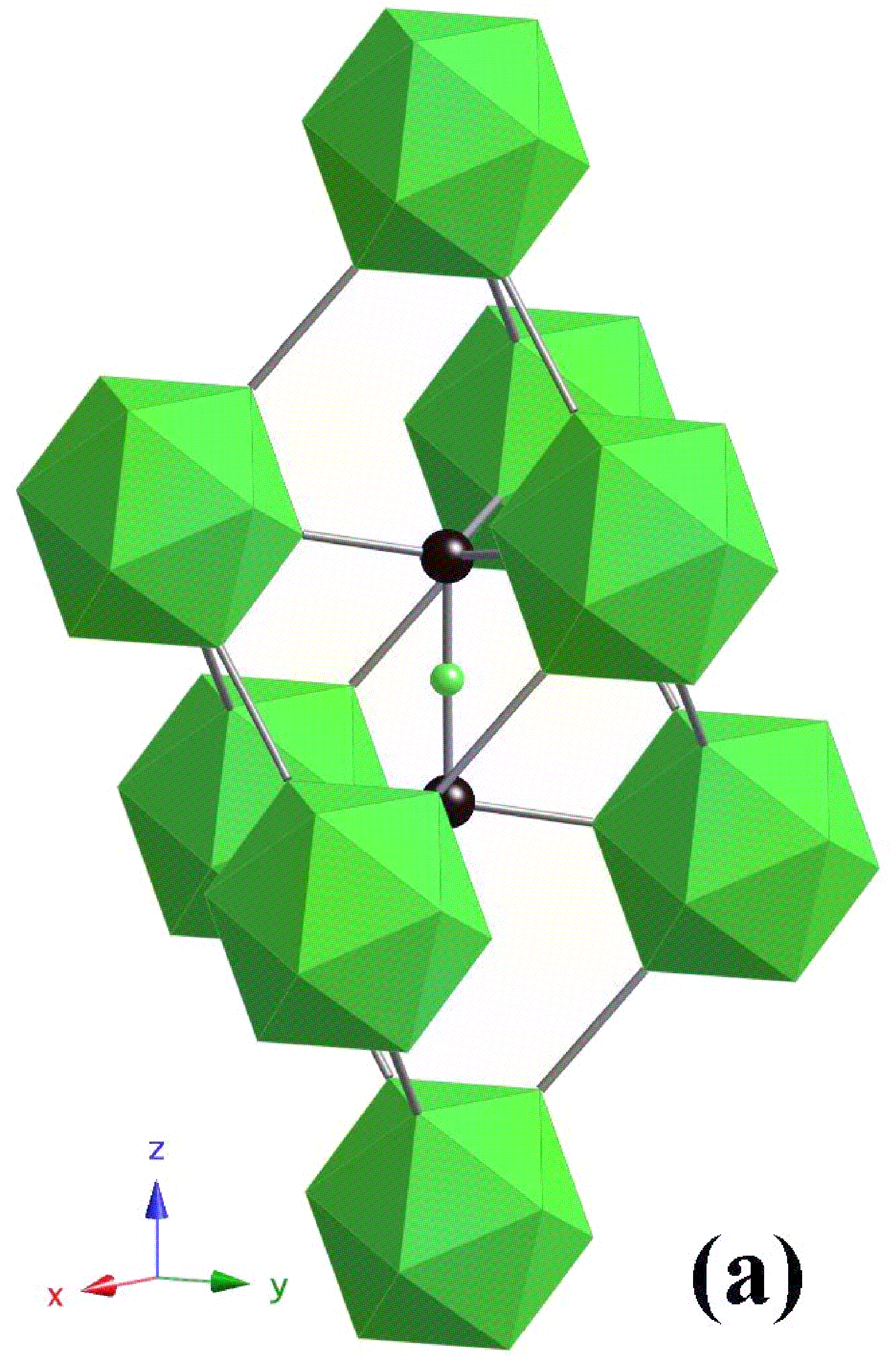
Boron carbide

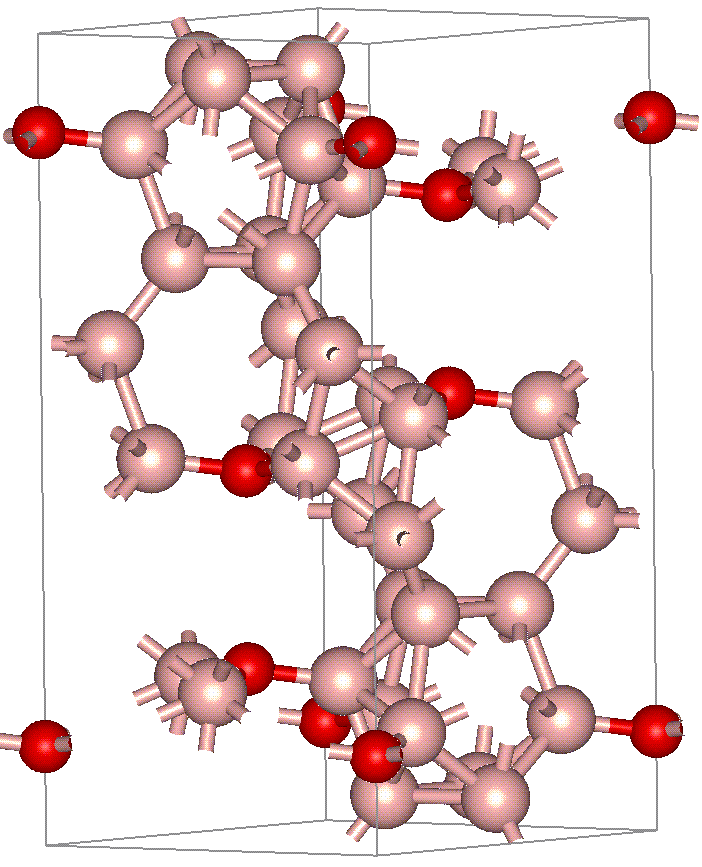
Crystal structure of B_{6}O

Other hard boron-rich compounds include B_{4}C and B_{6}O. Amorphous a-B_{4}C has a hardness of about 50 GPa, which is in the range of superhardness. It can be looked at as consisting of boron icosahedra-like crystals embedded in an amorphous medium. However, when studying the crystalline form of B_{4}C, the hardness is only about 30 GPa. This crystalline form has the same stoichiometry as B_{13}C_{3}, which consists of boron icosahedra connected by boron and carbon atoms. Boron suboxide (B_{6}O) has a hardness of about 35 GPa. Its structure contains eight B_{12} icosahedra units, which are sitting at the vertices of a rhombohedral unit cell. There are two oxygen atoms located along the (111) rhombohedral direction.

== Nanostructured superhard materials ==
Nanosuperhard materials fall into the extrinsic category of superhard materials. Because molecular defects affect the superhard properties of bulk materials it is obvious that the microstructure of superhard materials give the materials their unique properties. Focus on synthesizing nano superhard materials is around minimizing microcracks occurring within the structure through grain boundary hardening. The elimination of microcracks can strengthen the material by 3 to 7 times its original strength. Grain boundary strengthening is described by the Hall-Petch equation

$$\sigma_c = \sigma_0 + \frac{k_\text{gb}}{\sqrt{d}}$$

Here σ_{c} is the critical fracture stress, d the crystallite size and σ_{0} and k_{gb} are constants.

If a material is brittle its strength depends mainly on the resistance to forming microcracks. The critical stress which causes the growth of a microcrack of size a_{0} is given by a general formula

$$\sigma_c = k_\text{crack} \sqrt{\frac{2E\gamma_s}{\pi a_0}} \propto \frac{1}{\sqrt{d}}$$

Here E is the Young's modulus, k_{crack} is a constant dependent on the nature and shape of the microcrack and the stress applied and γ_{s} the surface cohesive energy.

The average hardness of a material decreases with d (crystallite size) decreasing below 10 nm. There have been many mechanisms proposed for grain boundary sliding and hence material softening, but the details are still not understood. Besides grain boundary strengthening, much attention has been put into building microheterostructures, or nanostructures of two materials with very large differences in elastic moduli. Heterostructures were first proposed in 1970 and contained such highly ordered thin layers that they could not theoretically be separated by mechanical means. These highly ordered heterostructures were believed to be stronger than simple mixtures. This theory was confirmed with Al/Cu and Al/Ag structures. After the formation of Al/Cu and Al/Ag, the research was extended to multilayer systems including Cu/Ni, TiN/VN, W/WN, Hf/HfN and more. In all cases, decreasing the lattice period increased the hardness. One common form of a nanostructured material is aggregated diamond nanorods, which is harder than bulk diamond and is currently the hardest (~150 GPa) material known.

== See also ==
- Beta carbon nitride
- Borazon – Brand name of a cubic form of boron nitride (cBN)
- Iron tetraboride
- Lonsdaleite – Hexagonal lattice allotrope of carbon
- Aluminium magnesium boride – Chemical compound
