= Ruthenium boride =

High hardness element compounds of ruthenium and boron

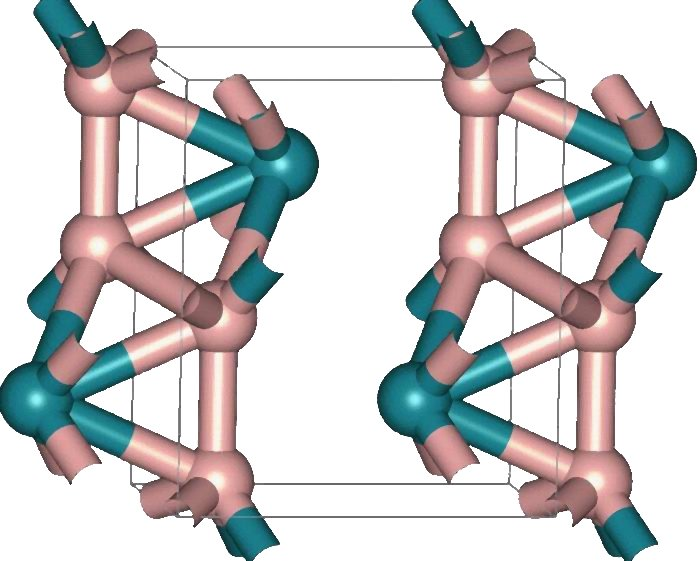
Structure of orthorhombic RuB_{2}. Green atoms are Ru, pink - boron

Ruthenium borides are compounds of ruthenium and boron. Their most remarkable property is potentially high hardness. Vickers hardness H_{V} = 50 GPa was reported for thin films composed of RuB_{2} and Ru_{2}B_{3} phases. This value is significantly higher than those of bulk RuB_{2} or Ru_{2}B_{3}, but it has to be confirmed independently, as measurements on superhard materials are intrinsically difficult. For example, note that the initial report on extreme hardness of related material rhenium diboride was probably too optimistic.

== Structure ==
Ruthenium diboride was first thought to have a hexagonal structure, as in rhenium diboride, but it was later tentatively determined to possess an orthorhombic structure.

For the crystal structure of RuB_{2}, it was found that the boron atoms were arranged in puckered layers with the "boat" configuration, which formed 2D sheets within a 3D network of metallic bondings of ruthenium atoms. Additionally, such a "boat" configuration was found to be critical in promoting the activity and stability of RuB_{2} in the hydrogen evolution reaction (HER).
