= Osmium borides =

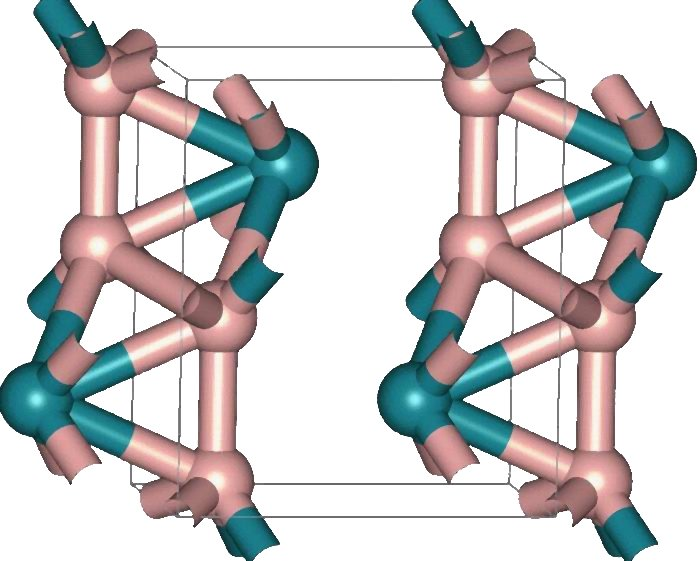
Structure of orthorhombic OsB_{2}. Green atoms are Os, pink – boron

Osmium borides are compounds of osmium and boron. Their most remarkable property is potentially high hardness. It is thought that a combination of high electron density of osmium with the strength of boron-osmium covalent bonds will make osmium borides superhard materials, however this has not been demonstrated yet. For example, OsB_{2} is hard (hardness comparable to that of sapphire), but not superhard.

== Synthesis ==
Osmium borides are produced in vacuum or inert atmosphere to prevent formation of osmium tetroxide, which is a hazardous compound. Synthesis occurs at high temperatures (~1,000 °C (1,830 °F)) from a mixture of MgB_{2} and OsCl_{3}.

== Structure ==
Three osmium borides are known: OsB, Os_{2}B_{3} and OsB_{2}. The first two have hexagonal structure, similar to that of rhenium diboride. Osmium diboride was first also sought as hexagonal, but one of its phases was later reassigned to orthorhombic. In recent methods of synthesis, it has also been found that a hexagonal phase of OsB_{2} exists with a similar structure to ReB_{2}.
