= Aluminium magnesium boride =

Chemical compound

Aluminium magnesium boride or Al_{3}Mg_{3}B_{56}, colloquially known as BAM, is a chemical compound of aluminium, magnesium and boron. Whereas its nominal formula is AlMgB_{14}, the chemical composition is closer to Al_{0.75}Mg_{0.75}B_{14}. It is a ceramic alloy that is highly resistive to wear and has an extremely low coefficient of sliding friction, reaching a record value of 0.04 in unlubricated and 0.02 in lubricated AlMgB_{14}−TiB_{2} composites. First reported in 1970, BAM has an orthorhombic structure with four icosahedral B_{12} units per unit cell. This ultrahard material has a coefficient of thermal expansion comparable to that of other widely used materials such as steel and concrete.

== Synthesis ==
BAM powders are commercially produced by heating a nearly stoichiometric mixture of elemental boron (low grade because it contains magnesium) and aluminium for a few hours at a temperature in the range 900 °C to 1500 °C. Spurious phases are then dissolved in hot hydrochloric acid. To ease the reaction and make the product more homogeneous, the starting mixture can be processed in a high-energy ball mill. All pretreatments are carried out in a dry, inert atmosphere to avoid oxidation of the metal powders.

BAM films can be coated on silicon or metals by pulsed laser deposition, using AlMgB_{14} powder as a target, whereas bulk samples are obtained by sintering the powder.

BAM usually contains small amounts of impurity elements (e.g., oxygen and iron) that enter the material during preparation. It is thought that the presence of iron (most often introduced as wear debris from mill vials and media) serves as a sintering aid. BAM can be alloyed with silicon, phosphorus, carbon, titanium diboride (TiB_{2}), aluminium nitride (AlN), titanium carbide (TiC) or boron nitride (BN).

== Properties ==
BAM has the lowest known unlubricated coefficient of friction (0.04) possibly due to self-lubrication.

=== Structure ===
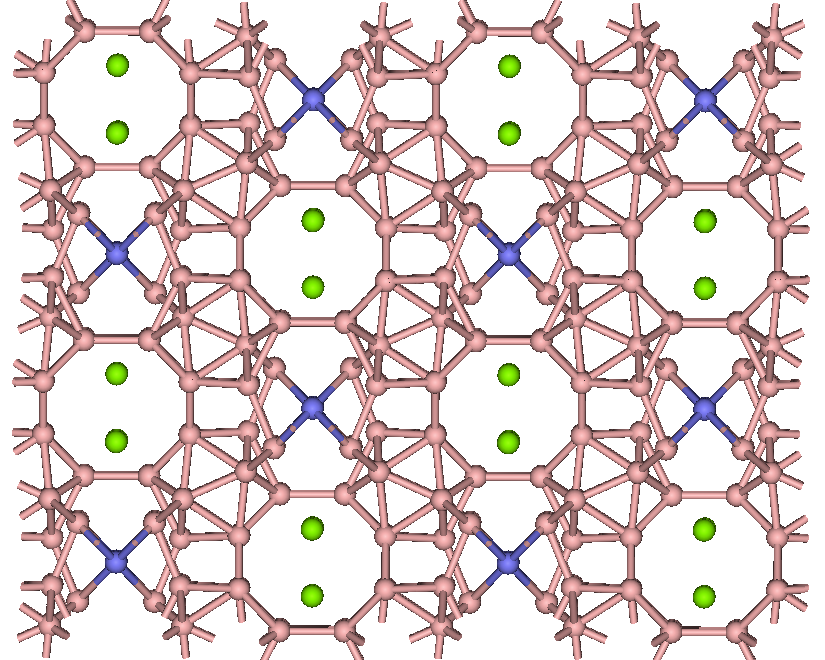
Crystal structure of BAM viewed along the a crystal axis. Blue: Al, green: Mg, red: B.

Most superhard materials have simple, high-symmetry crystal structures, e.g., diamond cubic or zinc blende. However, BAM has a complex, low-symmetry crystal structure with 64 atoms per unit cell. The unit cell is orthorhombic and its most salient feature is four boron-containing icosahedra. Each icosahedron contains 12 boron atoms. Eight more boron atoms connect the icosahedra to the other elements in the unit cell. The occupancy of metal sites in the lattice is lower than one, and thus, while the material is usually identified with the formula AlMgB_{14}, its chemical composition is closer to Al_{0.75}Mg_{0.75}B_{14}. Such non-stoichiometry is common for borides (see crystal structure of boron-rich metal borides and boron carbide). The unit cell parameters of BAM are a = 1.0313 nm, b = 0.8115 nm, c = 0.5848 nm, Z = 4 (four structure units per unit cell), space group Imma, Pearson symbol oI68, density 2.59 g/cm^{3}. The melting point is roughly estimated as 2000 °C.

=== Optoelectronic ===
BAM has a bandgap of about ~1.5 eV. Significant absorption is observed at sub-bandgap energies and attributed to metal atoms. Electrical resistivity depends on the sample purity and is about 10^{4} Ohm·cm. The Seebeck coefficient is relatively high, between −5.4 and −8.0 mV/K. This property originates from electron transfer from metal atoms to the boron icosahedra and is favorable for thermoelectric applications.

=== Hardness & Fracture toughness ===
The microhardness of BAM powders is 32–35 GPa. It can be increased to 45 GPa by alloying with Boron rich Titanium Boride, Fracture toughness can be increased with TiB_{2} or by depositing a quasi-amorphous BAM film. Addition of AlN or TiC to BAM reduces its hardness. By definition, a hardness value exceeding 40 GPa makes BAM a superhard material. In the BAM−TiB_{2} composite, the maximum hardness and toughness are achieved at ~60 vol.% of TiB_{2}. The wear rate is improved by increasing the TiB_{2} content to 70–80% at the expense of ~10% hardness loss. The TiB_{2} additive is a wear-resistant material itself with a hardness of 28–35 GPa.

=== Thermal expansion ===
The thermal expansion coefficient (TEC, also known as Coefficient Of Thermal Expansion, COTE) for AlMgB_{14} was measured as 9×10^{−6} K^{−1} by dilatometry and by high temperature X-ray diffraction using synchrotron radiation. This value is fairly close to the COTE of widely used materials such as steel, titanium and concrete. Based on the hardness values reported for AlMgB_{14} and the materials themselves being used as wear resistant coatings, the COTE of AlMgB_{14} could be used in determining coating application methods and the performance of the parts once in service.

Material	TEC (10^{−6} K^{−1})
AlMgB_{14}	9
Steel	11.7
Ti	8.6
Concrete	10–13

=== Friction ===
A composite of BAM and TiB_{2} (70 volume percent of TiB_{2}) has one of the lowest values of friction coefficients, which amounts to 0.04–0.05 in dry scratching by a diamond tip (cf. 0.04 for Teflon) and decreases to 0.02 in water-glycol-based lubricants.

== Applications ==
BAM is commercially available and is being studied for potential applications. For example, pistons, seals and blades on pumps could be coated with BAM or BAM + TiB_{2} to reduce friction between parts and to increase wear resistance. The reduction in friction would reduce energy use. BAM could also be coated onto cutting tools. The reduced friction would lessen the force necessary to cut an object, extend tool life, and possibly allow increased cutting speeds. Coatings only 2–3 micrometers thick have been found to improve efficiency and reduce wear in cutting tools.

== See also ==
- Non-stick surface
