= Plutonium borides =

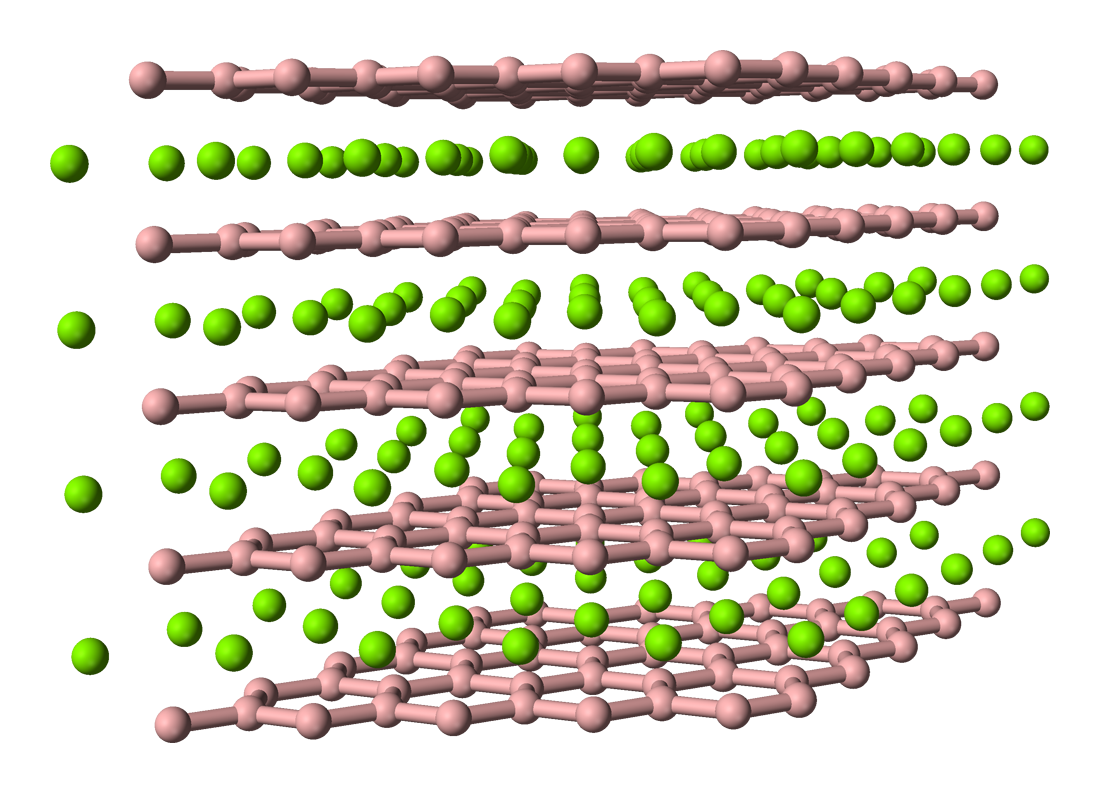
Structure of PuB_{2}: boron atoms shown red in hexagonally bonded network; metal atoms shown green in interleaving layers

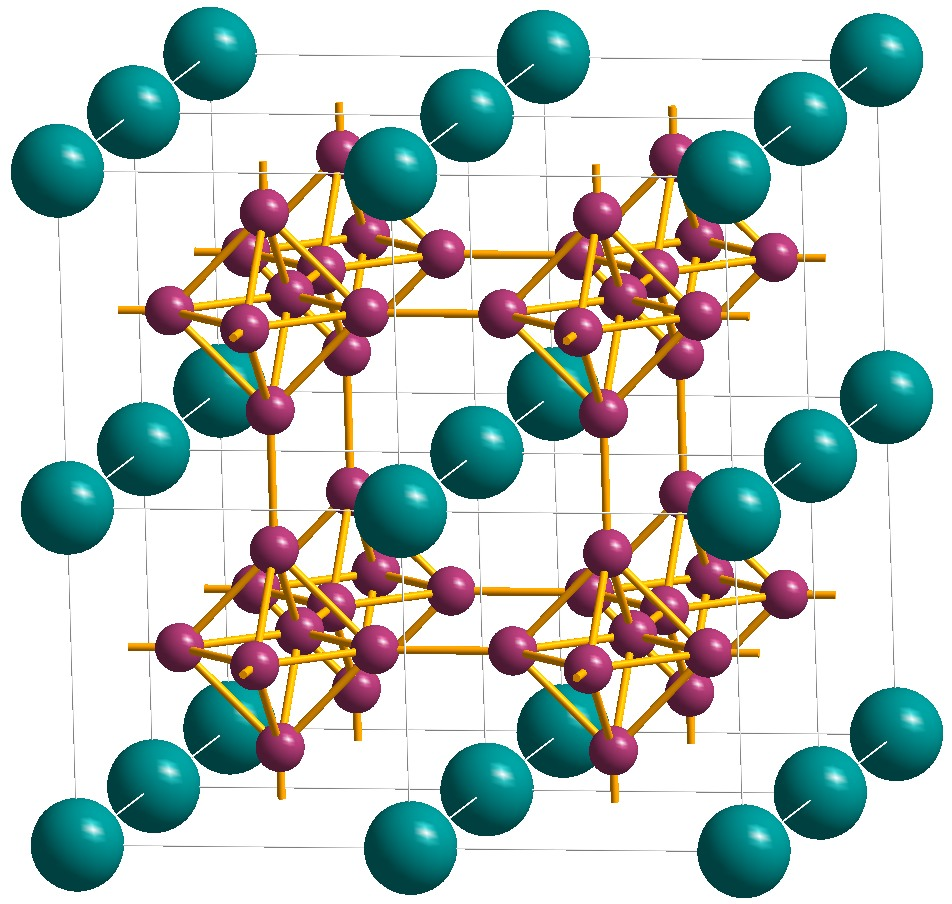
Structure of PuB_{6} (boron atoms in octahedral groups shown red with plutonium atoms shown blue at cubical vertices; bonding depiction is naïve)

Several plutonium borides can be formed by direct combination of plutonium and boron powders in an inert atmosphere at reduced pressure.

PuB was reported to form at 1200 °C with a range of 40–70% boron. It supposedly has a Pu-B bond length of 2.46 Å and the NaCl structure, as do TiB, ZrB and HfB. The existence of PuB was contested later based on several arguments.

PuB_{2} is formed at 800 °C and has a similar structure to most other metal diborides.

At 1200 °C with 70–85% boron, mixtures of PuB_{4} and PuB_{6} are formed, with more of the latter as the temperature increases; PuB_{4} has the tetragonal structure (same as UB_{4}), and PuB_{6} has cubic structure, same as all hexaborides (CaB_{6}, LaB_{6} etc.).

The most remarkable plutonium boride is arguably PuB_{66}, previously misidentified as PuB_{100}. Its existence demonstrates the importance of contamination in boride research because as little as 1% of an impurity is capable of changing its crystal structure.
