= Heterodiamond =

Heterodiamond is a superhard material containing boron, carbon, and nitrogen (BCN). It is formed at high temperatures and high pressures, e.g., by application of an explosive shock wave to a mixture of diamond and cubic boron nitride (c-BN). The heterodiamond is a polycrystalline material coagulated with nano-crystallites and the fine powder is tinged with deep bluish black. The heterodiamond has both the high hardness of diamond and the excellent heat resistance of cubic BN. These characteristic properties are due to the diamond structure combined with the sp^{3} σ-bonds among carbon and the heteroatoms.

Cubic BC_{2}N can be synthesized from graphite-like BC_{2}N at pressures above 18 GPa and temperatures higher than 2,200 K (1,930 °C). The bulk modulus of c-BC_{2}N is 282 GPa which is one of the highest bulk moduli known for any solid, and is exceeded only by the bulk moduli of diamond and c-BN. The hardness of c-BC_{2}N is higher than that of c-BN single crystals.

== See also ==
- Boron nitride
