= Aluminium diboride =

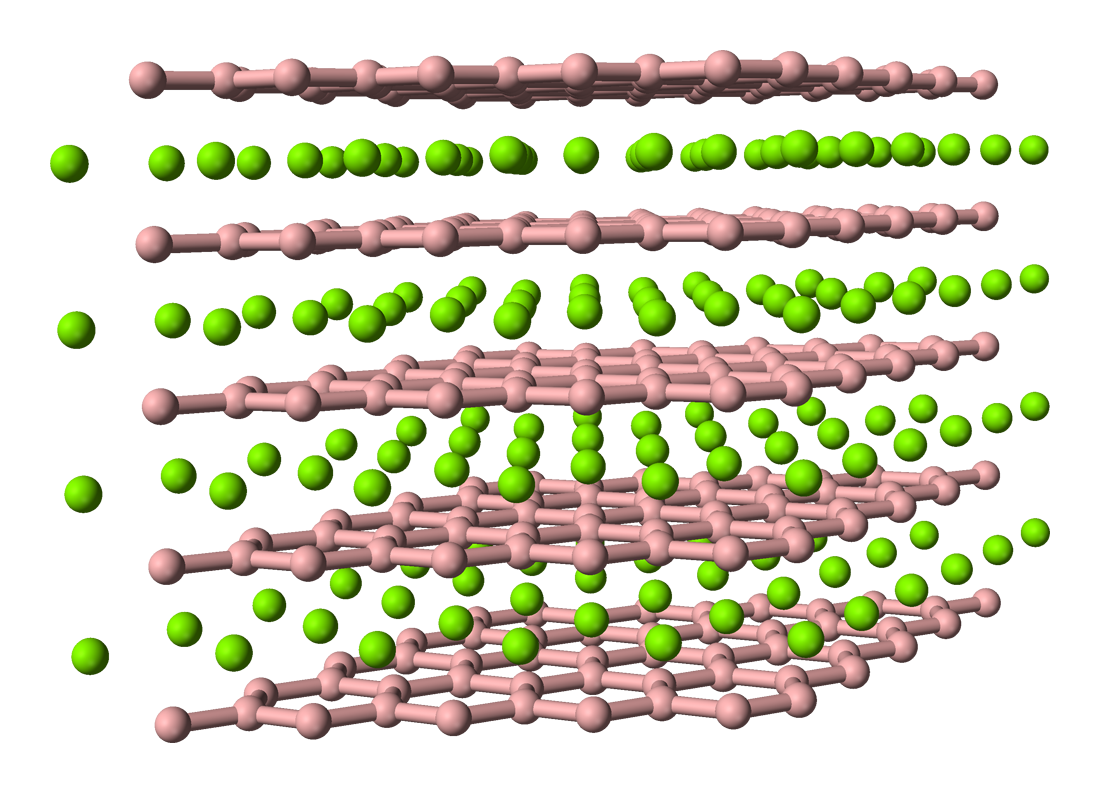

Names
- IUPAC name aluminium diboride
- Other names aluminium boride

Identifiers
CAS Number	12041-50-8
3D model (JSmol)	Interactive image
ChemSpider	21171253
ECHA InfoCard	100.031.736
EC Number	234-923-7
PubChem CID	24884166
CompTox Dashboard (EPA)	DTXSID90898993
- InChI: InChI=1S/Al.B2/c;1-2/q-2;+2 Key: XGNZNBRDPPLKTC-UHFFFAOYSA-N; InChI=1/Al.B2/c;1-2/q-2;+2/rAlB2/c1-2-3-1 Key: XGNZNBRDPPLKTC-DOGMWQOPAK
- SMILES: B1=B[Al]1

Properties
Chemical formula	AlB_{2}
Molar mass	48.604 g/mol
Appearance	Copper-red solid
Density	3.19 g/cm^{3}
Melting point	>920 °C (decomposes)
Solubility in water	insoluble

Structure
Crystal structure	Hexagonal, hP3
Space group	P6/mmm, No. 191
Lattice constant	a = 0.3009 nm, b = 0.3009 nm, c = 0.3262 nm, α = 90°, β = 90°, γ = 120°
Formula units (Z)	1

Thermochemistry
Heat capacity (C)	43.6 J/mol K
Std molar entropy (S^{⦵}_{298})	34.7 J/mol K
Std enthalpy of formation (Δ_{f}H^{⦵}_{298})	−151 kJ/mol
- Except where otherwise noted, data are given for materials in their standard state (at 25 °C [77 °F], 100 kPa). verify (what is ?) Infobox references

Aluminium diboride (AlB_{2}) is a chemical compound made from the metal aluminium and the metalloid boron. It is one of two compounds of aluminium and boron, the other being AlB_{12}, which are both commonly referred to as aluminium boride.

Structurally the B atoms form graphite-like sheets with Al atoms between them, and this is very similar to the structure of magnesium diboride. Single crystals of AlB_{2} exhibit metallic conductivity along the axis parallel to the basal hexagonal plane.

Aluminium boride is considered a hazardous substance as it reacts with acids and hydrogen gas to produce toxic gases. For example, it reacts with hydrochloric acid to release borane and aluminium chloride.

The crystal structure of AlB_{2} is often used as a prototype structure to describe intermetallic compounds. There are a large number of structure types that fall within the AlB_{2} structural family.

== See also ==
- Boride
