= Iron tetraboride =

Names
- IUPAC name Iron tetraboride

Identifiers
3D model (JSmol)	Interactive image
- InChI: InChI=1S/4B.Fe Key: JRZHEZVJDLIZIR-UHFFFAOYSA-N
- SMILES: [B].[B].[B].[B].[Fe]

Properties
Chemical formula	FeB_{4}
Molar mass	99.0920 g/mol

Structure
Crystal structure	orthorhombic
- Except where otherwise noted, data are given for materials in their standard state (at 25 °C [77 °F], 100 kPa). Infobox references

Iron tetraboride (FeB_{4}) is a superhard superconductor (T_{c} < 3K) consisting of iron and boron. Iron tetraboride does not occur in nature and can be created synthetically. Its molecular structure was predicted using computer models.

It has been shown that under pressure, iron tetraboride transforms into a transparent phase with lower conductivity, converting from a superconductor to a semiconductor. Another study that pressurised the compound up to 1 TPa identified that it further becomes a conductor after its semiconducting phase.

== See also ==
- Binghamton University
- European Synchrotron Radiation Facility
