= Tungsten borides =

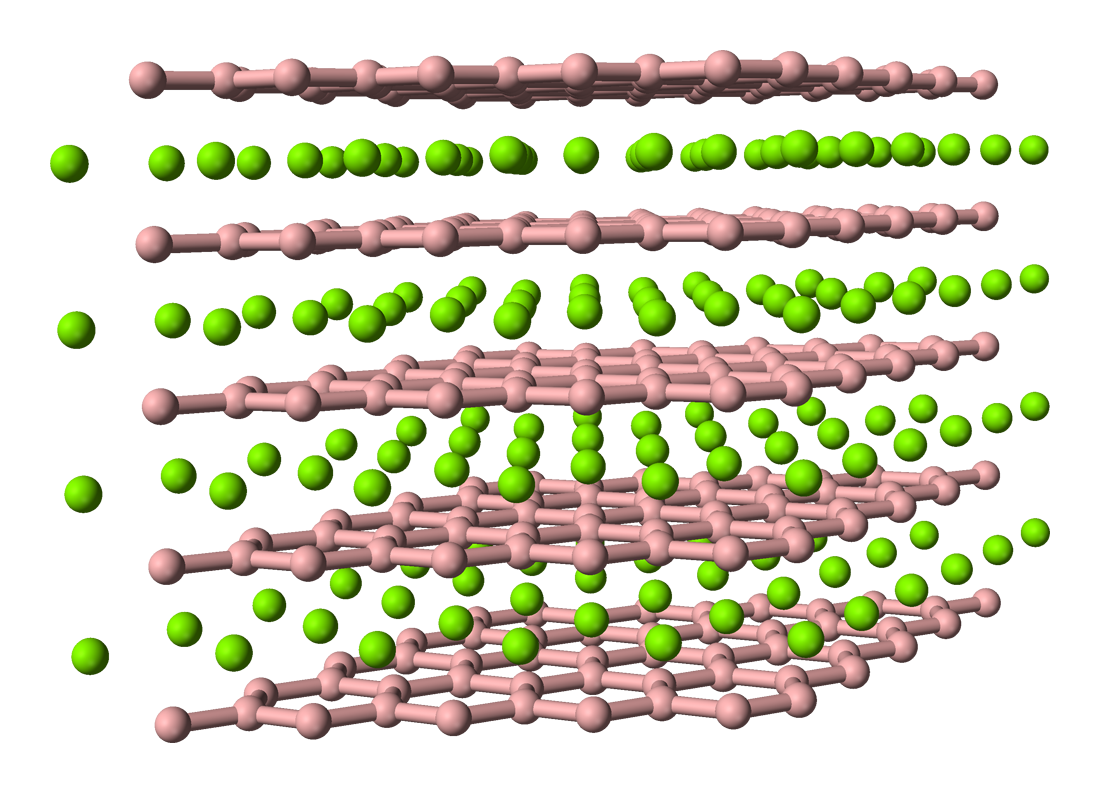
Structure of hexagonal WB_{2}

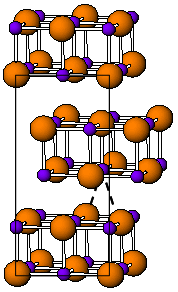
Structure of orthorhombic β-WB

Tungsten borides are compounds of tungsten and boron. Their most remarkable property is high hardness. The Vickers hardness of WB or WB_{2} crystals is ~20 GPa and that of WB_{4} is ~30 GPa for loads exceeding 3 N.

== Synthesis ==
Single crystals of WB_{2−x}, x = 0.07–0.17 (about 1 cm diameter, 6 cm length) were produced by the floating zone method, and WB_{4} crystals can be grown by arc-melting a mixture of elemental tungsten and boron.

== Structure ==
WB_{2} has the same hexagonal structure as most diborides (AlB_{2}, MgB_{2}, etc.). WB has several forms, α (tetragonal), β (orthorhombic) and δ (tetragonal).

== Properties ==
δ-WB and WB_{2} crystals have metallic resistivities of 0.1 and 0.3 mΩ·cm, respectively. The oxidation of W_{2}B, WB and WB_{2} is significant at temperatures above 600 °C. The final oxidation products contain WO_{3} and probably amorphous B_{2}O_{3} or H_{3}BO_{3}. The melting temperatures of W_{2}B, WB and WB_{2} are 2670, 2655 and 2365 °C, respectively.

Properties
Material	Vickers hardness (GPa)	Bulk Modulus (GPa)	Melting point (°C)
W_{2}B			2670
WB	~20		2655
WB_{2}	~20		2365
WB_{4}	~30		
