= Uranium diboride =

Uranium boride
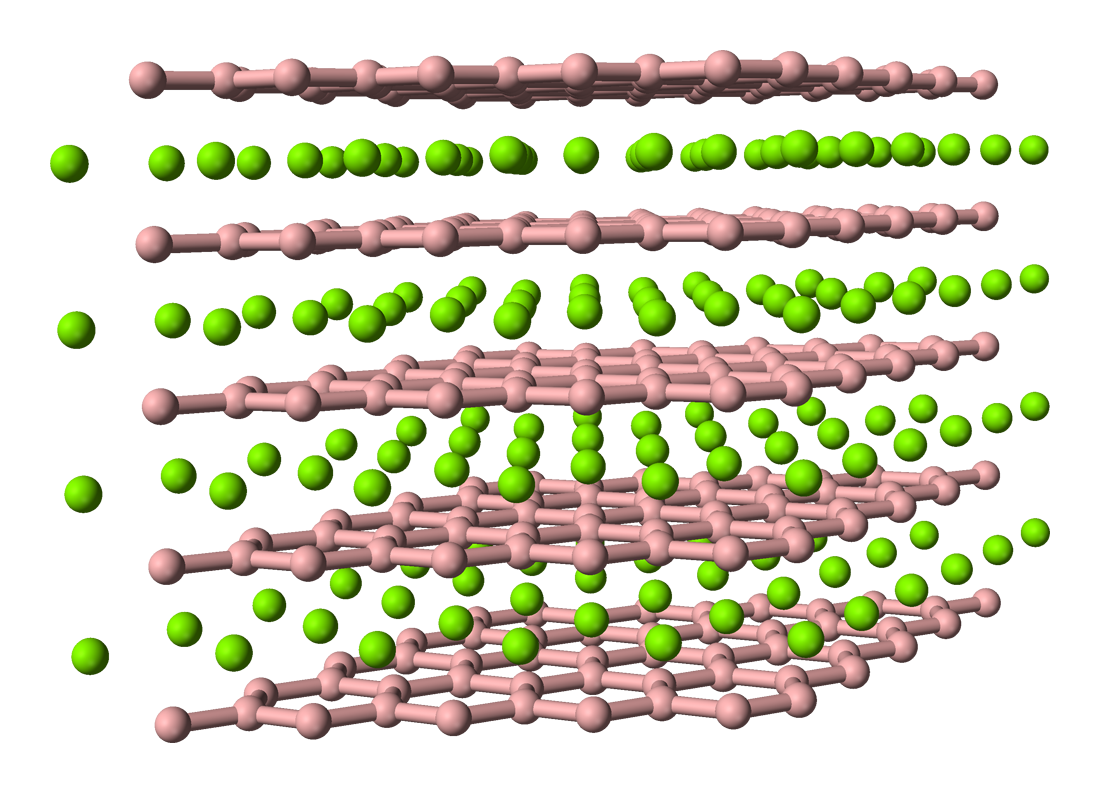
- Uranium boride

Identifiers
CAS Number	12007-36-2
3D model (JSmol)	Interactive image
ChemSpider	74717
ECHA InfoCard	100.031.358
EC Number	234-508-0
PubChem CID	82795
CompTox Dashboard (EPA)	DTXSID901045484
- InChI: InChI=1S/2B.U Key: QPXOIGGWJBMJIH-UHFFFAOYSA-N
- SMILES: B#[U]#B

Properties
Chemical formula	UB_{2}
Molar mass	259.651 g/mol
Density	12.7 g/cm^{3}
Melting point	2,430 °C (4,410 °F; 2,700 K)
- Except where otherwise noted, data are given for materials in their standard state (at 25 °C [77 °F], 100 kPa). verify (what is ?) Infobox references

Uranium boride (UB_{2}), a compound of uranium and boron, is a very stable glassy boride material that is insoluble in water.

It is being explored as an ingredient in high entropy alloys, and as a method of immobilizing uranium-based radioactive waste, and rendering it safe for long-term storage. It has some applications in endocurietherapy, a method of radiation therapy wherein radioactive microspheres are implanted directly into the treatment site and allowed to remain for an extended period of time, may also use this class of material as it would not be attacked while in situ.

It is being considered as a nuclear fuel material as it has a high density and thermal conductivity.
