= Rhenium diboride =

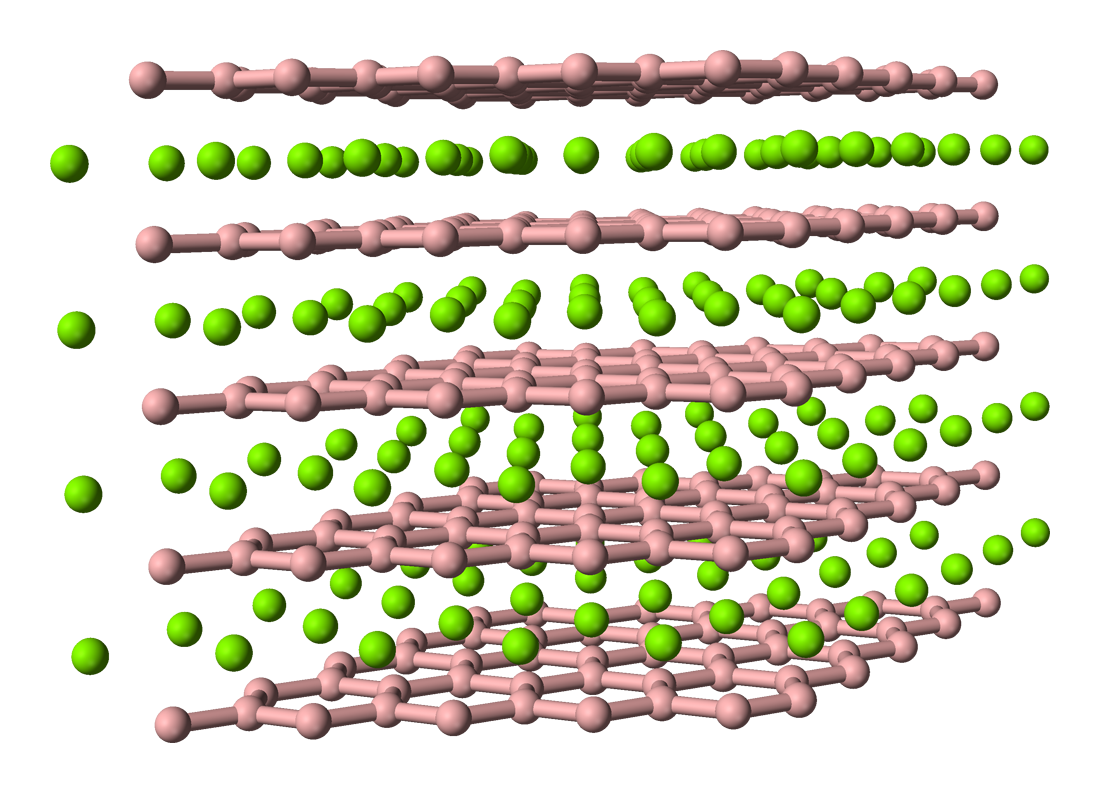

Names
- IUPAC name Rhenium diboride

Identifiers
CAS Number	12355-99-6
3D model (JSmol)	Interactive image
ChemSpider	32817250
EC Number	234-959-3
PubChem CID	57418167
- InChI: InChI=1S/2B.Re Key: OLXPHXSOQYDZNT-UHFFFAOYSA-N
- SMILES: B#[Re]#B

Properties
Chemical formula	ReB_{2}
Molar mass	207.83 g/mol
Appearance	black powder
Density	12.7 g/cm^{3}
Melting point	2,400 °C (4,350 °F; 2,670 K)
Solubility in water	none

Structure
Crystal structure	Hexagonal, Space group P6_{3}/mmc.

Hazards
- GHS labelling
Pictograms	(GHS07: Exclamation mark)
Signal word	Warning
Hazard statements	H315, H319, H335
Precautionary statements	P261, P280, P304+P340, P305+P351+P338, P405, P501
- Except where otherwise noted, data are given for materials in their standard state (at 25 °C [77 °F], 100 kPa). verify (what is ?) Infobox references

Rhenium diboride (ReB_{2}) is a synthetic high-hardness material that was first made in 1962. The compound is formed from a mixture of rhenium, noted for its resistance to high pressure, and boron, which forms short, strong covalent bonds with rhenium. It has regained popularity in recent times in hopes of finding a material that possesses hardness comparable to that of diamond.

Unlike other high-hardness synthetic materials, such as the c-BN, rhenium diboride can be made at ambient pressure, potentially simplifying a mass production. However, the high cost of rhenium and commercial availability of alternatives such as polycrystalline c-BN, make a prospect of large-scale applications less likely.

== Synthesis ==
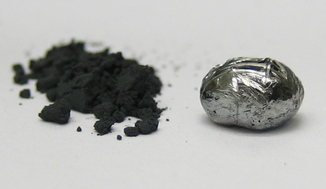
Rhenium diboride, ReB_{2}

ReB_{2} can be made by at least three different methods at standard atmospheric pressure: solid-state metathesis, melting in an electric arc, and direct heating of the elements.

In the metathesis reaction, rhenium trichloride and magnesium diboride are mixed and heated in an inert atmosphere and the magnesium chloride byproduct is washed away. Excess boron is needed to prevent the formation of other phases such as Re_{7}B_{3} and Re_{3}B.

In the arc-melting method, rhenium and boron powders are mixed and a large electric current is passed through the mixture, also in an inert atmosphere.

In the direct reaction method, the rhenium-boron mixture is sealed in a vacuum and held at a high temperature over a longer period (1,000 °C for five days).

At least the last two methods are capable of producing pure ReB_{2} without any other phases, as confirmed by X-ray crystallography.

== Hardness ==
Rhenium diboride is occasionally, and controversially, cited as a "superhard material" due to its high hardness level. However, tested in the asymptotic-hardness region, as recommended for hard and superhard materials, rhenium diboride demonstrates a Vickers hardness of only 30.1 ± 1.3 GPa at 4.9 N, well below the generally-accepted threshold of 40 GPa or more needed to classify it as "superhard". Another research has estimated the H_{v} of full-dense ReB_{2} at about 22 GPa under an applied load of 2.94 N, comparable to that of tungsten carbide, silicon carbide, titanium diboride or zirconium diboride.

Values greater than 40 GPa have been observed only in tests with very low loads, which is not a suitable testing method for this type of solids. In one test, the lowest tested load of 0.49 N yielded the average hardness of 48 ± 5.6 GPa and a maximum hardness of 55.5 GPa, which is comparable to the hardness of cubic boron nitride (c-BN) under an equivalent load. Such phenomenon of inverse relationship between the applied load and hardness is known as the indentation size effect.

In recent times, there has been a significant amount of research into improving the hardness and other properties of the ReB_{2}. In one study, the hardness for the ReB_{2}(R-3m) polymorph was estimated at 41.7 GPa, while for the ReB_{2}(P6_{3}/mmc) it was placed at c.a. 40.6 GPa. In another study, a fully dense B_{4}C-27wt.%ReB_{2} ceramic composite nanopowder was fabricated by spark plasma sintering. It has exhibited a microhardness of 50 ± 3 GPa under a 49 N load in the asymptotic-hardness region and had a 3.2 g/cm^{3} density, comparable with the hardness and density of the c-BN.

The hardness of ReB_{2} exhibits considerable anisotropy because of its hexagonal layered structure, being greatest along the c axis. Two factors contribute to the high hardness of ReB_{2}: a high density of valence electrons, and an abundance of short covalent bonds. Rhenium has one of the highest valence electron densities of any transition metal (476 electrons/nm^{3}, compare to 572 electrons/nm^{3} for osmium and 705 electrons/nm^{3} for diamond). The addition of boron requires only a 5% expansion of the rhenium lattice because the small boron atoms fill the existing spaces between the rhenium atoms. Furthermore, the electronegativities of rhenium and boron are close enough (1.9 and 2.04 on the Pauling scale) that they form covalent bonds in which the electrons are shared almost equally.

== See also ==
- Ruthenium boride
- Network covalent bonding
- Superhard material
