= Gold leaf =

Very thin gold used in art

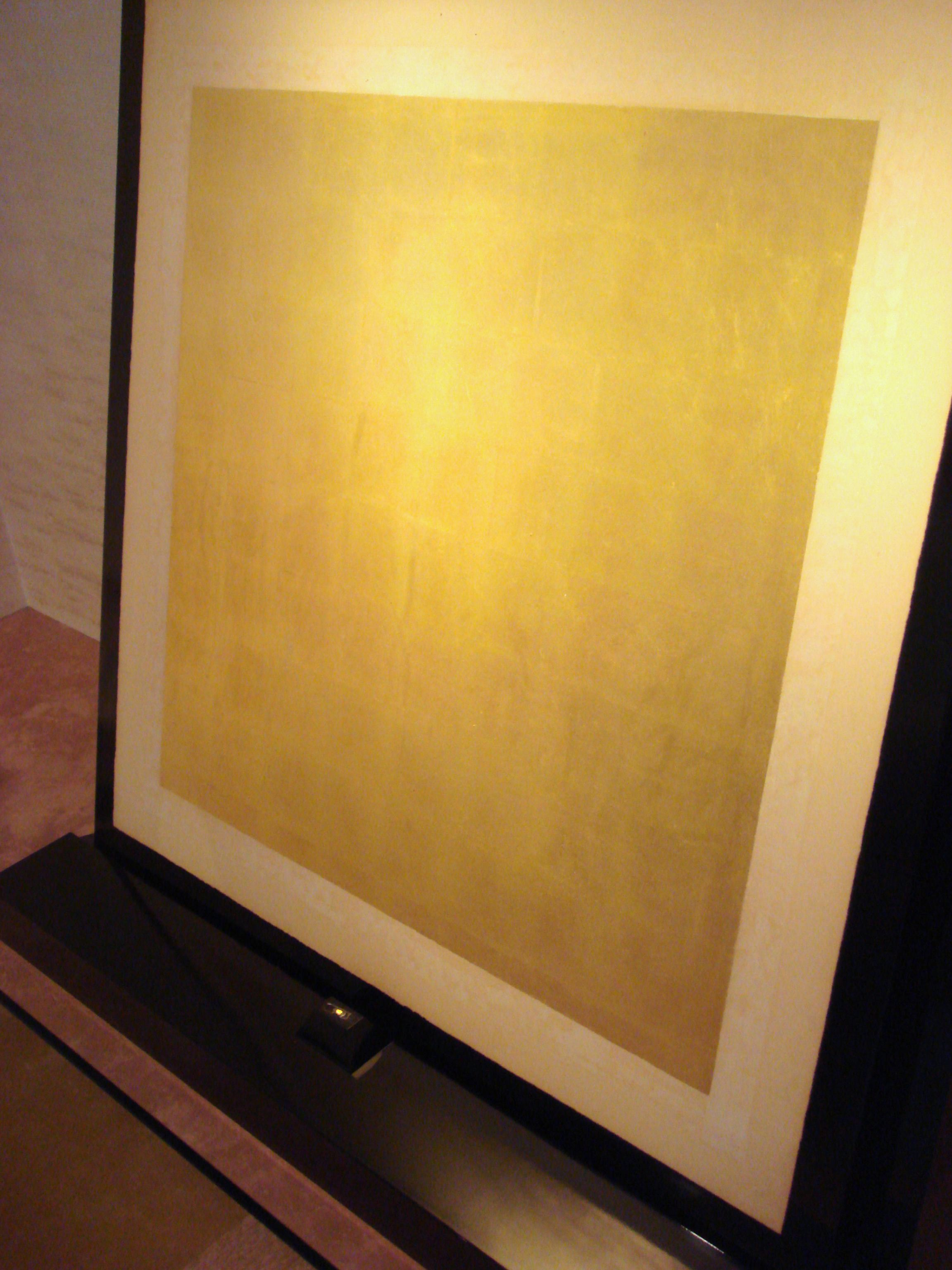
A gold nugget 5 mm (0.20 in) in diameter (bottom) can be expanded through hammering into a gold foil of about 0.5 m^{2} (5.4 ft^{2}). The Toi gold mine museum, Japan.

Gold leaf is gold that has been hammered into thin sheets (usually around 0.1 μm thick) by a process known as goldbeating, for use in gilding.

Gold leaf is a type of metal leaf, but the term is rarely used when referring to gold leaf. The term metal leaf is normally used for thin sheets of metal of any color that do not contain any real gold. Gold leaf is available in a wide variety of karats and shades. The most commonly used gold is 23-karat gold.

Traditional water gilding is the most difficult and highly regarded form of gold leafing. It has remained virtually unchanged for hundreds of years and is still done by hand.

== History ==
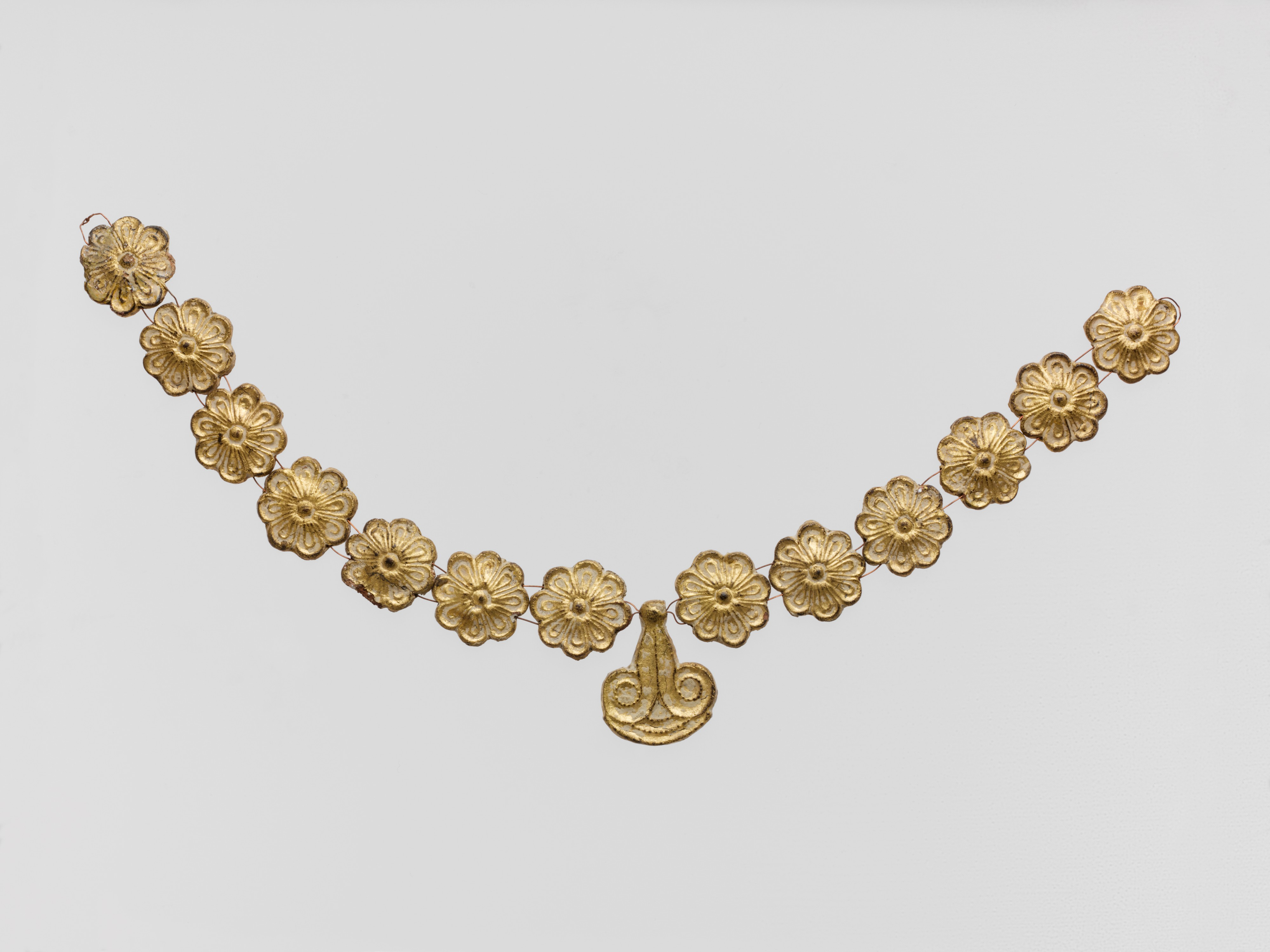
Mycenaean necklace; 1400–1050 BC; gilded terracotta; diameter of the rosettes: 2.7 cm (1.1 in), with variations of about 0.1 cm (0.04 in), and a pendant length of 3.7 cm (1.5 in); Metropolitan Museum of Art (New York City)

Five thousand years ago, Egyptian artisans recognized the extraordinary durability and malleability of gold and became the first goldbeaters and gilders. They pounded gold using a round stone to create the thinnest leaf possible. Apart from the introduction of the cast-iron hammer and a few other innovations, the tools and techniques remained virtually unchanged for thousands of years until the modern invention of roller presses.

Gold-leaf forging is first known from Turkey about 8000 years ago. It is a traditional handicraft in Nanjing (China), produced as early as the Three Kingdoms (220–280 AD) and Two Jins (266–420) dynasties; it was used in Buddha-statue manufacturing and construction. It was widely used in the gilding of Buddha statues and idols and in the construction industry during the Eastern Wu (222–280) and Eastern Jin (266–420) dynasties. During the Qing dynasty (1640–1912), the technology developed, and Nanjing gold leaf was sold overseas. It retains traditional smelting, hand-beating and other techniques, and the gold leaf is pure, uniform and soft. On May 20, 2006, it was included in the first batch of national intangible cultural heritage representative items. Modern gold-leaf artists combine ancient traditional crafts with modern technology to make traditional gold leaf. Forging skills are more sophisticated. Gold-foil production in Nanjing follows the ancient production process. The forging process has been tempered by more than a dozen processes such as gold bar, leaf beat, twisting, opening, assembly, issuing, and foil cutting. It is also called "playing gold leaf". According to the needs of different products, a proportion of silver and copper is added; the metal is then melted into liquid form, poured into an iron tank, cooled to form gold bars, hammered into thin slices, cut into small gold pieces, and then covered with gold foil and hammered into gold foil repeatedly at high temperature.

== Production ==
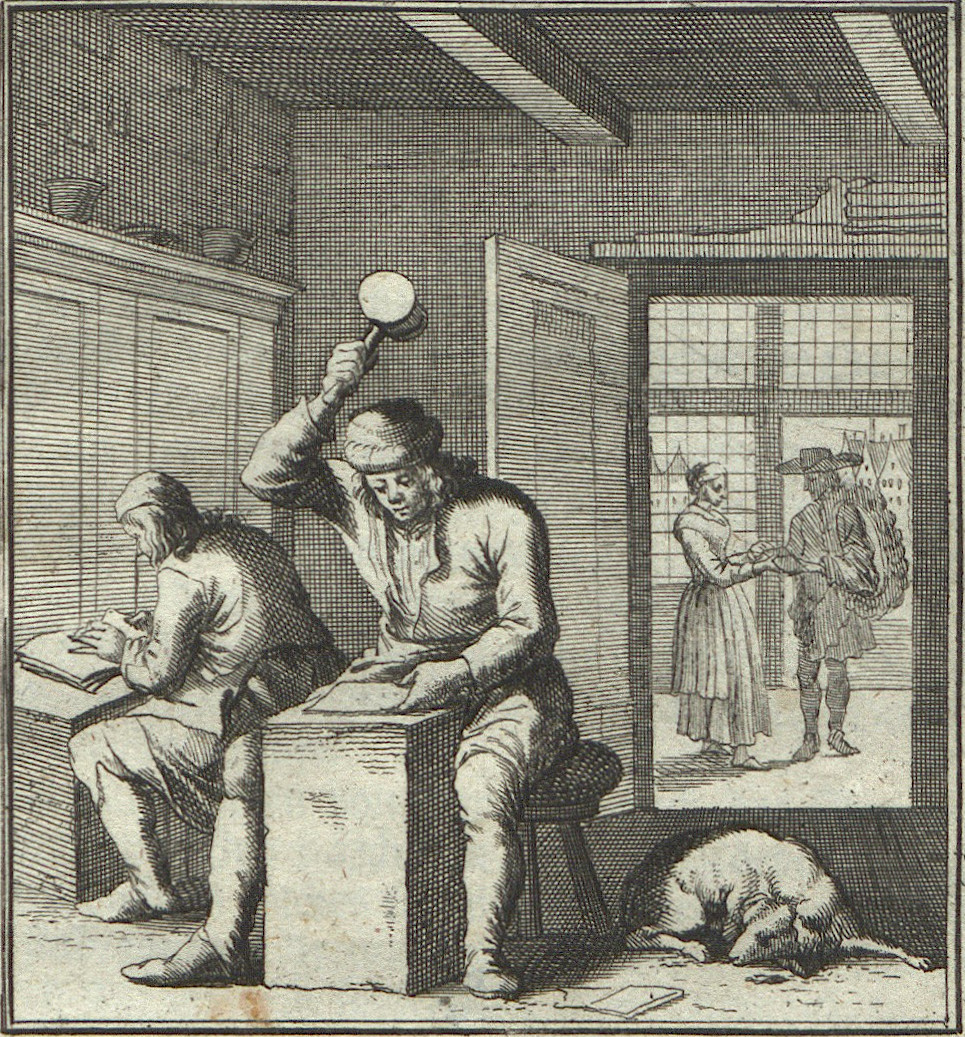
An engraving showing the goldbeating process, 1698

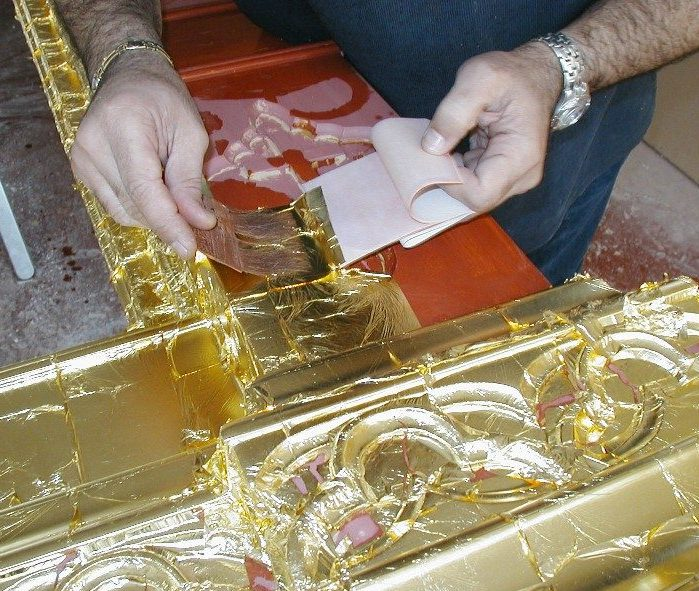
22k gold leaf applied with an ox hair brush during the process of gilding

The process of hammering gold into leaf is known as goldbeating.

The karat and color of gold leaf vary depending on the amount of silver or copper added to the gold. Most goldbeaters make 23 karat leaf. The gold and its alloy are put in a crucible and melted in a furnace. The liquid gold is poured into a mold to cast it into a bar. The bar of gold is put through a rolling mill repeatedly. Each time through the mill, the rollers are adjusted closer and closer to each other, to make the gold thinner and thinner. The bar is rolled to a thickness of 25 micrometres (1/1000 in).

After rolling, the ribbon of gold is cut into 2.5-centimetre (1 in) squares. The first step in the beating process is called the cutch. The cutch is made up of approximately 150 skins. In the early days of the trade, ox intestine membrane (goldbeater's skin) was used to interleave the gold as it was beaten. Today other materials, such as Mylar, are used. Using wooden pincers, the preparer picks up each square of gold and places it in the center of each skin. When the cutch is filled with the small gold squares, it is wrapped in several bands of parchment which serve to hold the packet together during the beating. Parchment is still the best material known to withstand the hours of repeated hammer blows needed to beat the gold.

Goldbeating in Mandalay (Myanmar)

The gold is beaten on a large, heavy block of marble or granite. These stone blocks were sometimes placed on top of a tree trunk set deep into the ground. This created greater resilience for the hammer. Beating of the cutch by hand takes about one hour using a 7-kilogram (15 lb) hammer. The goldbeater follows a pattern and sets up a rhythm, striking the packet with up to seventy strokes a minute. The packet is rotated and turned over to ensure that the gold inside expands evenly in all directions. The original small squares of gold are beaten until they have expanded to the outer edges of the 10 cm (4 in) square cutch. The gold is taken out of the cutch and each piece is cut into four pieces with a knife. Using the pincers, these squares of gold are put into a second packet called the shoder, which has approximately 1,500 skins. The shoder is beaten for about three hours until the gold has expanded to a 13 cm (5 in) square.

The gold is taken out of the shoder and placed on a leather-covered surface. The gold is thin enough now that the cutter can simply blow on it to flatten it out. Using a wooden implement called a wagon, the gold is quickly cut into four pieces and immediately placed in a packet called a mold for the final beating. The wagon has sharp cutting blades, traditionally made from malacca cane (rattan). The mold contains 1,500 pieces of gold. Before the mold is filled with gold, the skins are coated with a gypsum powder. This process prevents the delicate gold leaf from sticking to the skins. The mold is beaten with an 3.6-kilogram (8 lb) hammer for three to four hours until it has been beaten into a circle about 15 centimetres (6 in) in diameter. The finished leaf forms an unbroken sheet of gold with a thickness of approximately 100 nanometres (1/250000 in). After the leaves are taken out of the mold, they are conventionally cut into a 8.6-centimetre (3.375 in) square and packaged in tissue-paper books containing twenty-five leaves.

== Uses ==
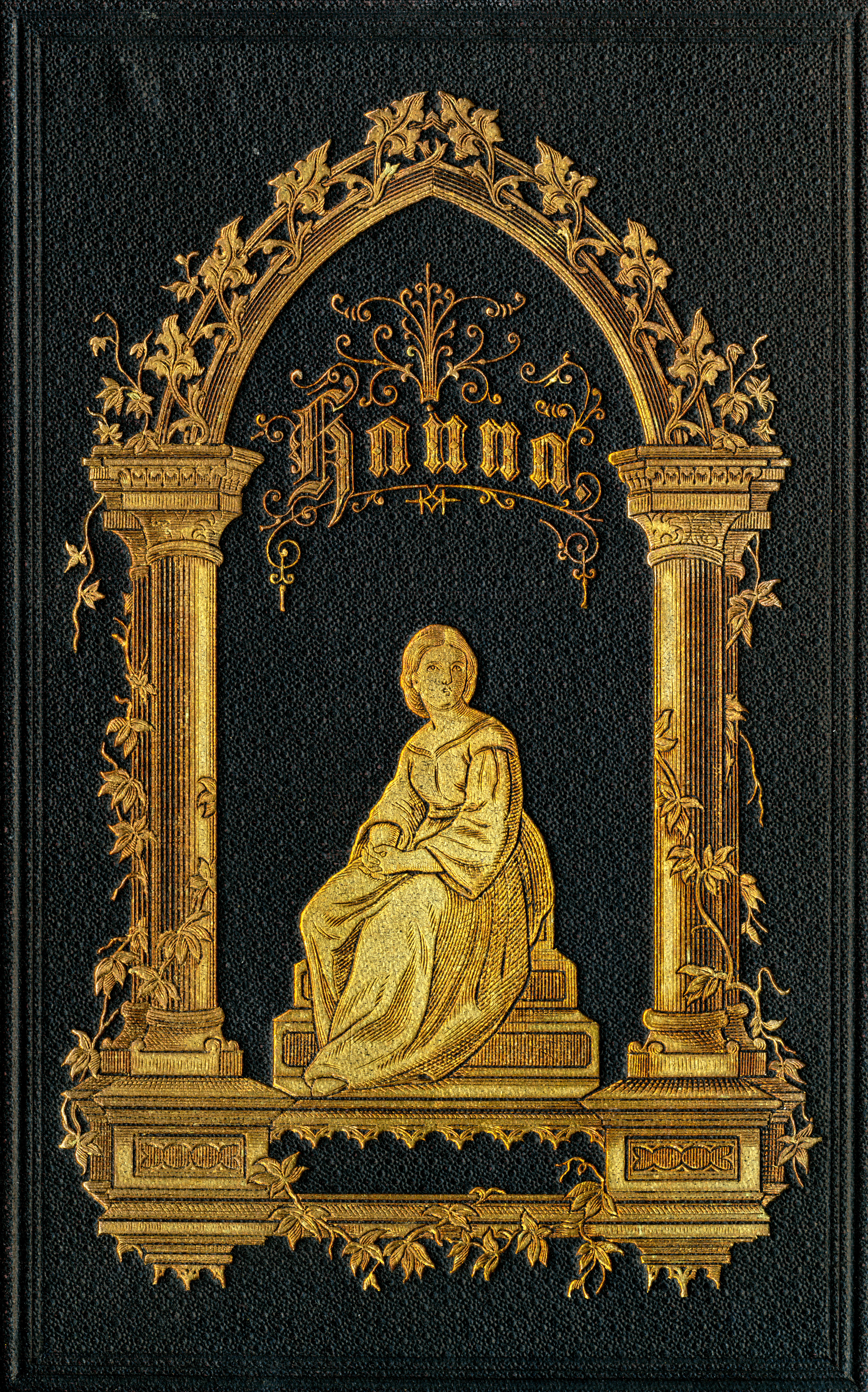
Early 20th century leather book cover, with gold leaf ornamentation

=== Art ===
Gold leaf is sometimes used in art in a "raw" state, without a gilding process. In cultures including the European Bronze Age it was used to wrap objects such as bullae simply by folding it tightly over, and the Classical group of gold lunulae are so thin, especially in the centre, that they might be classed as gold leaf. It has been used in jewellery in various periods, often as small pieces hanging freely.

The gold-ground style, where the background of the figures was all in gold, was introduced in mosaics in later Early Christian art. The style was then used in icons and Western panel paintings until the late Middle Ages. All the techniques for this style use gold leaf. The term "gold-ground" paintings typically references to religious panel paintings made during the late Middle Ages in Italy. Since the decline of gold ground painting, gold leaf has been most popular and most common in its use as gilding material for decoration of art (including statues and Eastern Christian icons) or the picture frames that are often used to hold or decorate paintings, mixed media, small objects (including jewellery) and paper art. Gold leaf is also used in Buddhist art and various other Asian traditions to decorate statues and symbols.

Gold glass is gold leaf held between two pieces of glass, and was used to decorate Ancient Roman vessels, where some of the gold was scraped off to form an image, as well as tesserae gold mosaics.

In Western illuminated manuscripts, gold areas are normally created by applying a glue to the page, then rubbing gold leaf onto the glue. Gold ink is rare. Gold leaf is the basis of the gold ink used in Islamic calligraphy and Islamic manuscript illumination, known as "tezhip." The leaves are crushed in honey or gum arabic, then suspended in gelatinous water. Because the gold is not pulverized as in industrially produced metal inks, the resulting surface looks very much like solid gold.

"Gold" frames made without leafing are also available for a considerably lower price, but traditionally some form of gold or metal leaf was preferred when possible and gold leafed (or silver leafed) moulding is still commonly available from many of the companies that produce commercially available moulding for use as picture frames.

=== Architecture ===
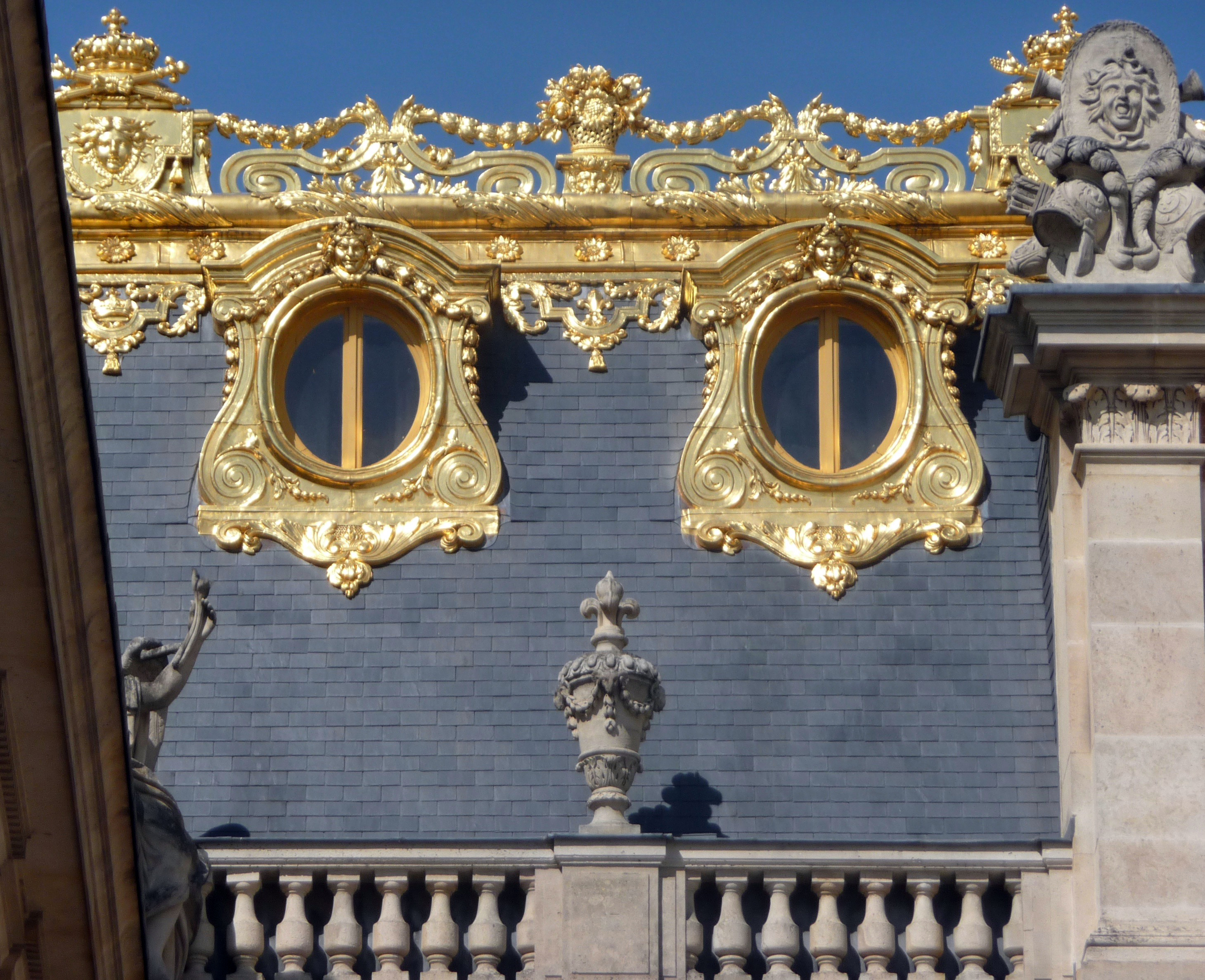
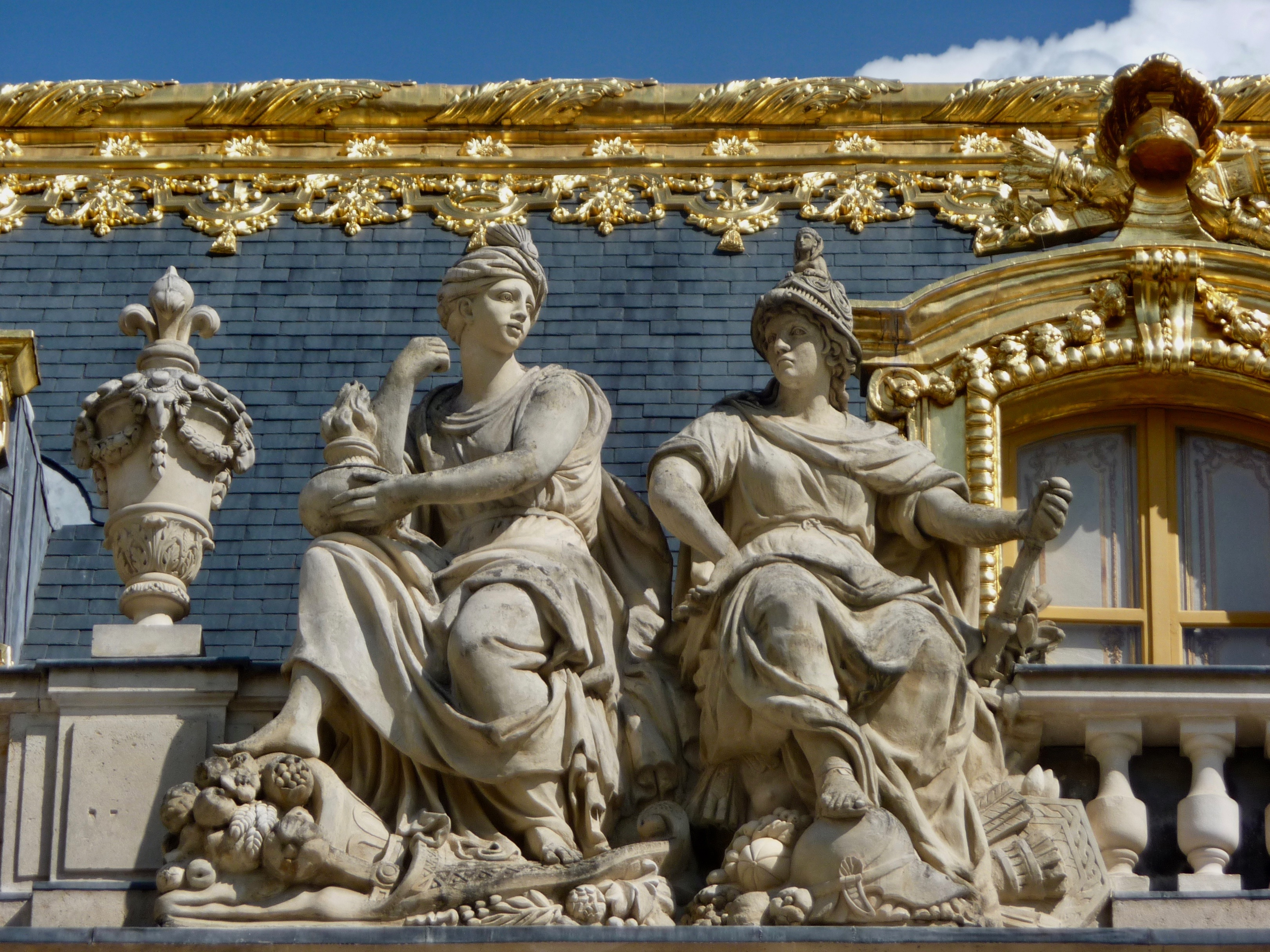
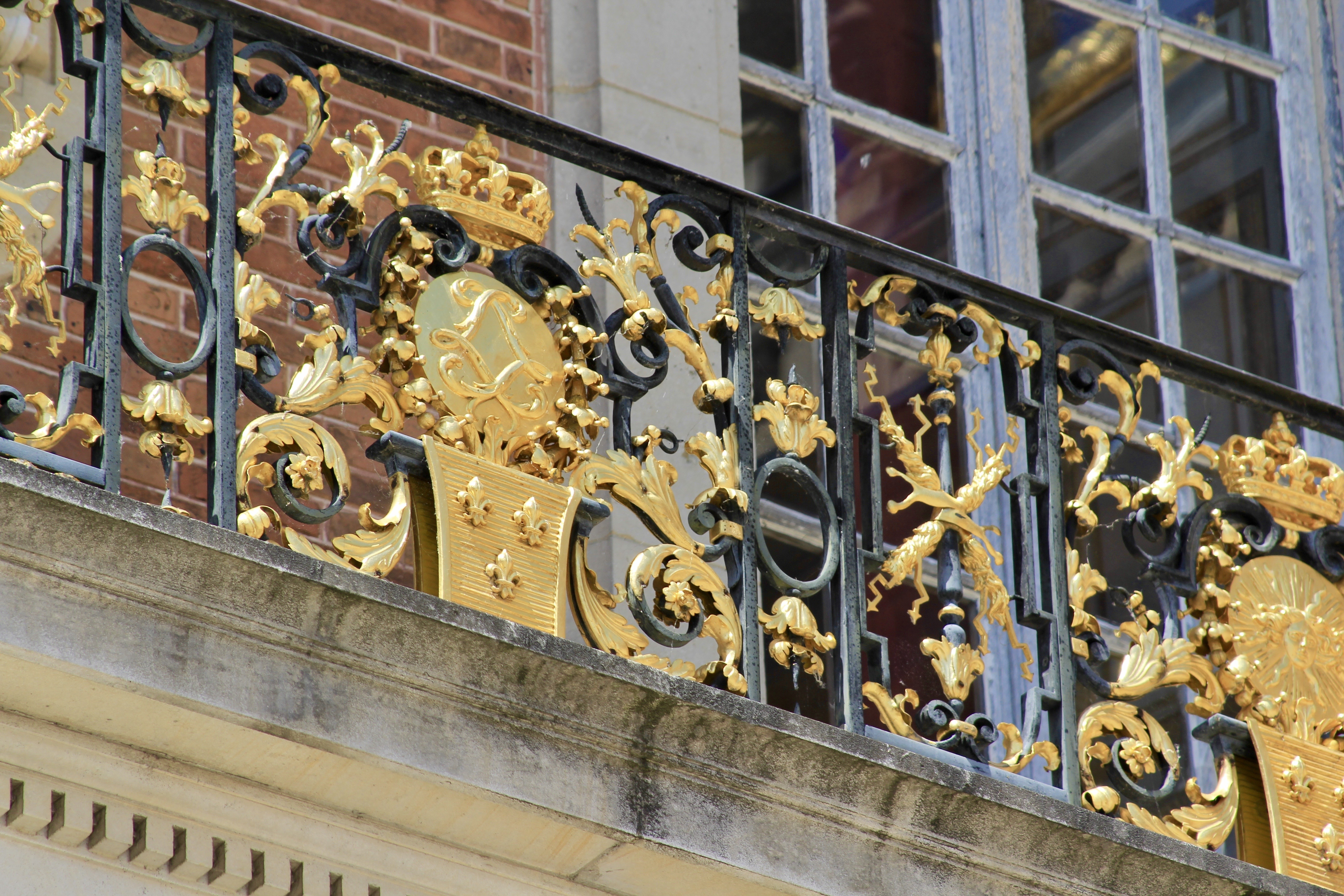
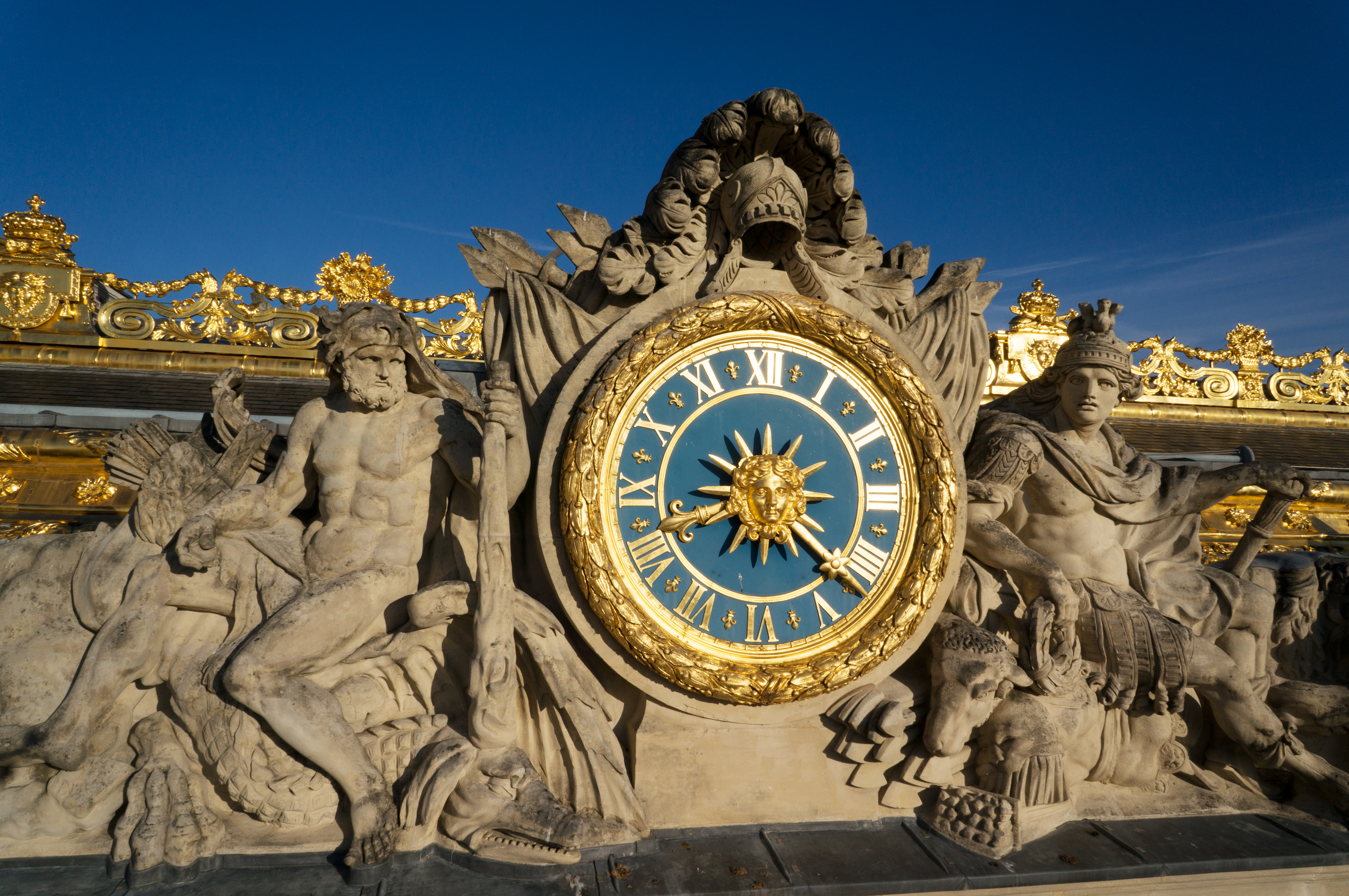
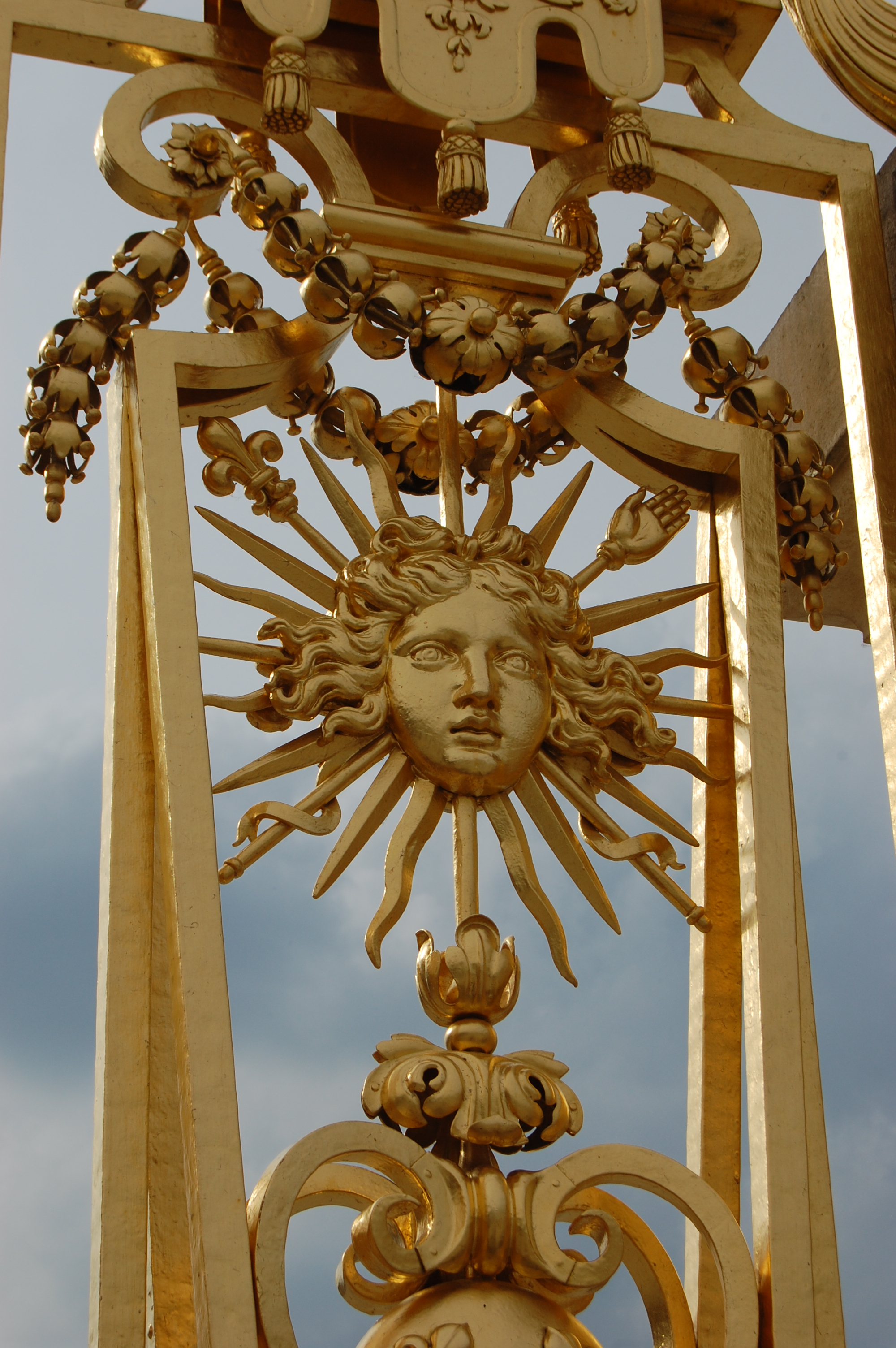
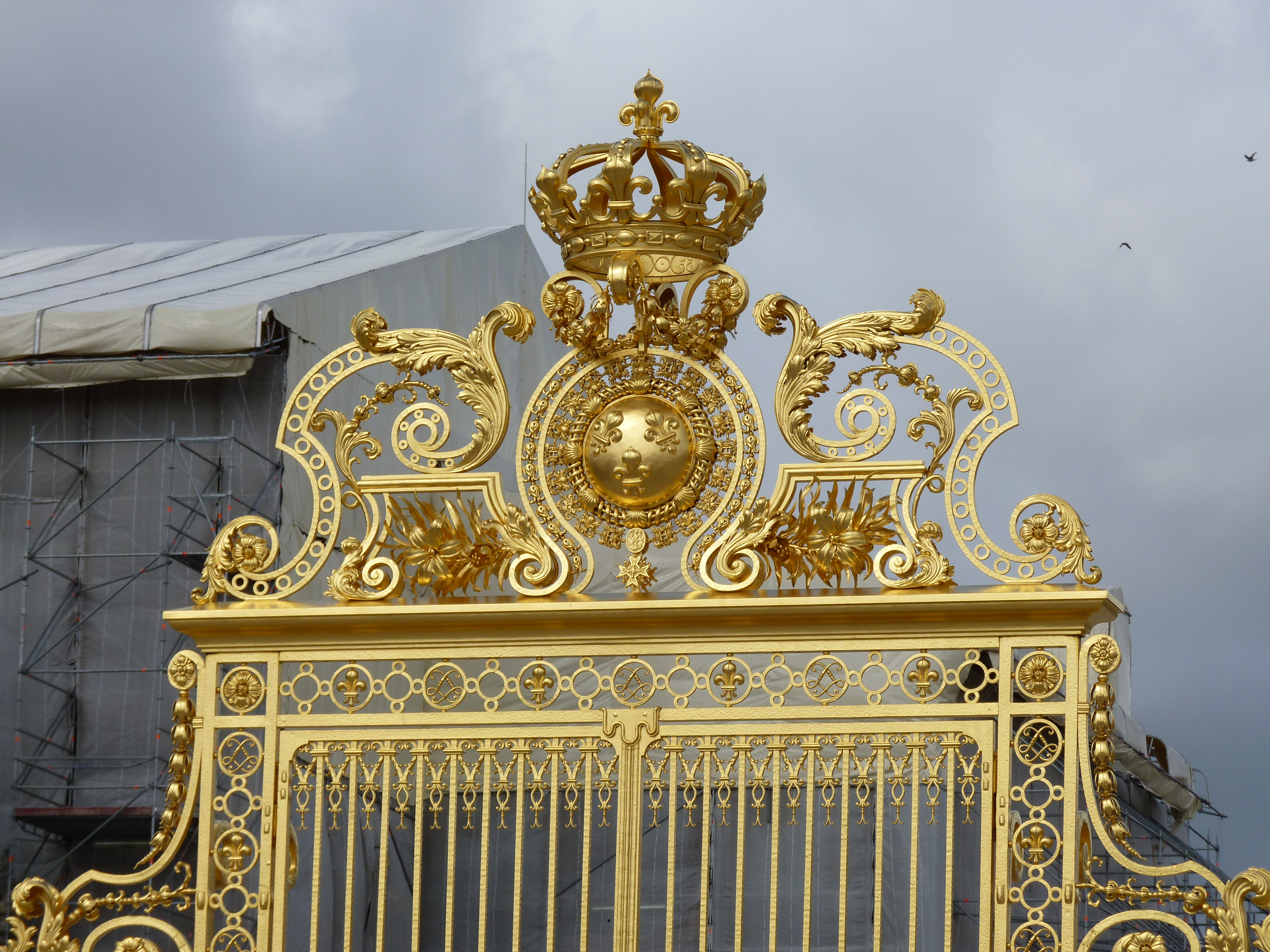
Various gilded architectural ornaments of the Palace of Versailles

Gold leaf has long been an integral component of architecture to designate important structures, both for aesthetics and because gold's non-reactive nature provides a protective finish.

Gold in architecture became an integral component of Byzantine and Roman churches and basilicas in 400 AD, most notably Basilica di Santa Maria Maggiore in Rome. The church was built by Pope Sixtus III and is one of the earliest examples of gold mosaics. The mosaics were made of stone, tile or glass backed on gold leaf walls, giving the church a beautifully intricate backdrop. The Athenian marble columns supporting the nave are even older, and either come from the first basilica, or from another antique Roman building; thirty-six are marble and four granite, pared down, or shortened to make them identical by Ferdinando Fuga, who provided them with identical gilt-bronze capitals. The 14th century campanile, or bell tower, is the highest in Rome, at 73 metres (240 ft). The basilica's 16th-century coffered ceiling, designed by Giuliano da Sangallo, is said to be gilded with gold that Christopher Columbus presented to Ferdinand and Isabella, before being passed on to the Spanish pope Alexander VI. The apse mosaic the Coronation of the Virgin is from 1295, signed by the Franciscan friar Jacopo Torriti.

The top two floors of the Golden Pavilion in the temple of Kinkaku-ji in Kyoto, Japan, which originally dates back to 1399, are entirely covered with 20 kg (44 lb) of 0.5 μm (20 μin) gold leaf.

In Ottawa, Ontario, the Centre Block is the main building of the Canadian parliamentary complex on Parliament Hill, containing the House of Commons and Senate chambers, as well as the offices of a number of members of parliament, senators, and senior administration for both legislative houses. It is also the location of several ceremonial spaces, such as the Hall of Honour, the Memorial Chamber, and Confederation Hall. Capping the Senate chamber is a gilded ceiling with deep octagonal coffers, each filled with heraldic symbols, including maple leaves, fleur-de-lis, lions rampant, clàrsach, Welsh Dragons, and lions passant. This plane rests on six pairs and four single pilasters, each of which is capped by a caryatid, and between which are clerestory windows. Below the windows is a continuous architrave, broken only by baldachins at the base of each of the above pilasters.

In London, the Criterion Restaurant is an opulent building facing Piccadilly Circus in the heart of London. It was built by architect Thomas Verity in Neo-Byzantine style for the partnership Spiers and Pond who opened it in 1873. One of the restaurant's most famous features is the 'glistering' ceiling of gold mosaic, coved at the sides and patterned all over with lines and ornaments in blue and white tesserae. The wall decoration accords well with the real yellow gold leaf ceiling, incorporating semi-precious stones such as jade, mother of pearl, turquoise being lined with warm marble and formed into blind arcades with semi-elliptical arches resting on slender octagonal columns, their unmolded capitals and the impost being encrusted with goldground mosaic

Gold leaf adorns the wrought iron gates surrounding the Palace of Versailles in France, when refinishing the gates nearly 200 years after they were torn down during the French Revolution, it required hundreds of kilograms of gold leaf to complete the process. Gold leaf was used in the oil painting of the Bamiyan Buddha approximately 1,500 years ago.

Gold leaf accents the facade of "it's a small world" at the Disneyland Resort in Anaheim, California.

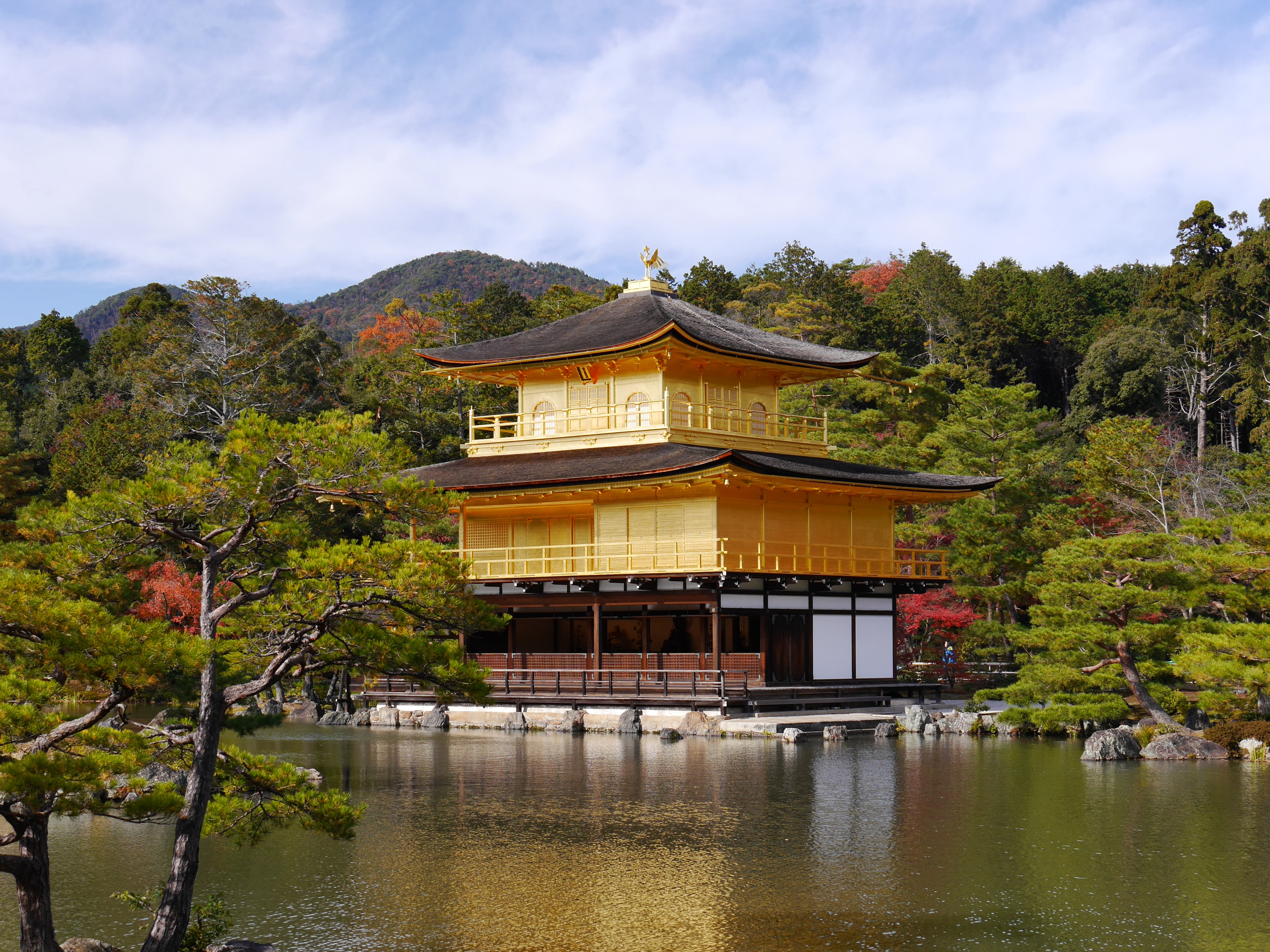
The Golden Pavilion of Kinkaku-ji, Kyoto, Japan

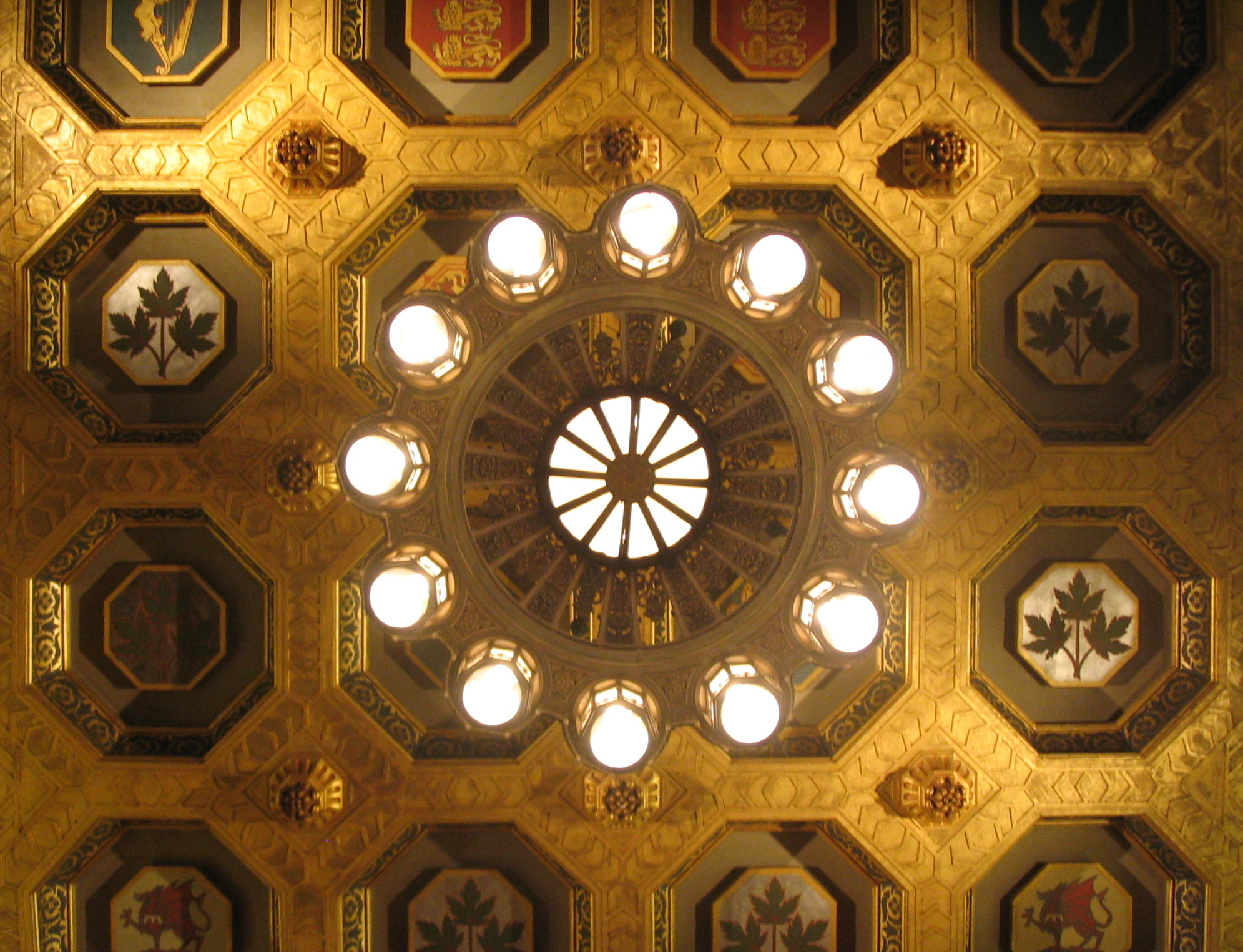
Gold leaf and painted coffers of the Senate chamber ceiling in Centre Block, Ottawa, Canada

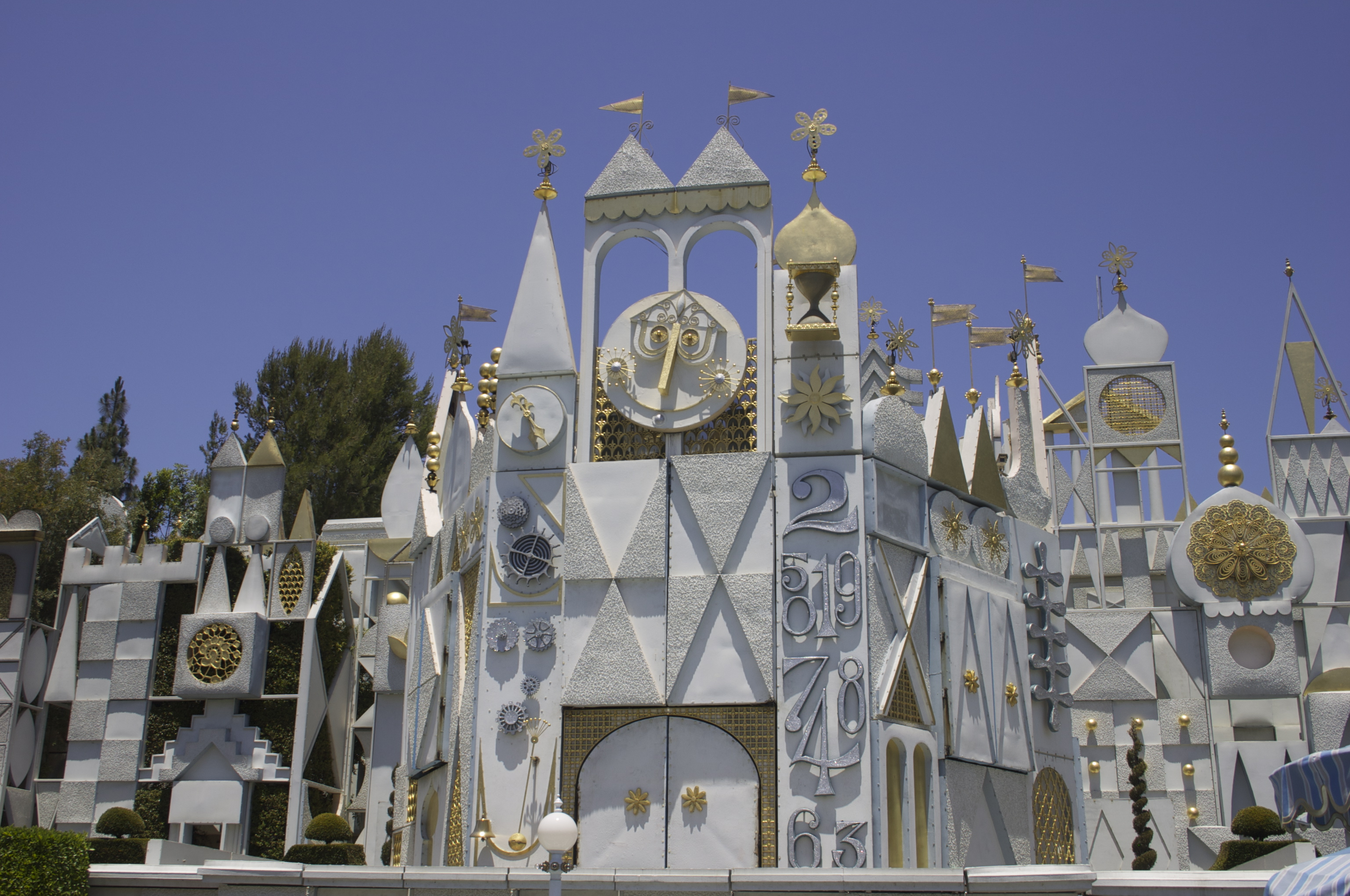
Gold leaf on the facade of the It's a Small World ride at Disneyland

=== Cuisine ===
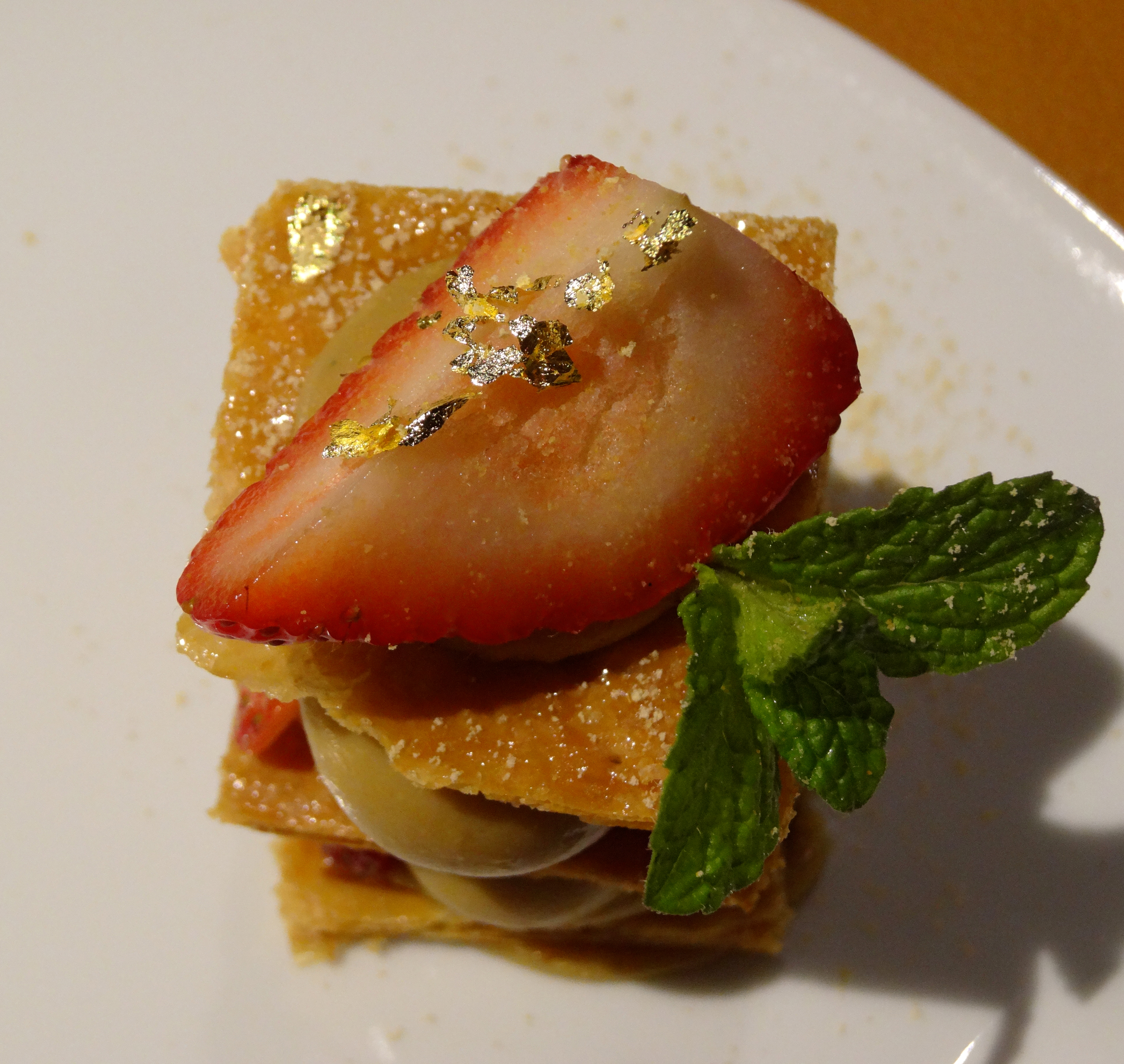
Mille-feuille with some gold leaf in the Nishimuraya Hotel Shogetsutei from Kinosaki, Hyōgo, Japan

Gold leaf (as well as other metal leaf such as vark) is sometimes used to decorate food or drink, typically to promote a perception of luxury and high value; however, it is flavorless. It is occasionally found in desserts and confectionery, including chocolates, honey and mithai. In India it may be used effectively as a garnish, with thin sheets placed on a main dish, especially on festive occasions. When used as an additive to food, gold has the E-number E175. A centuries-old traditional artisan variety of green tea contains pieces of gold leaf; 99% of this kind of tea is produced in Kanazawa, Japan, a historic city for samurai craftsmanship. The city is also home to a gold leaf museum, Kanazawa Yasue Gold Leaf Museum.

In continental Europe liquors with tiny floating pieces of gold leaf are known of since the late 16th century; originally the practice was regarded as medicinal. Well-known examples are Danziger Goldwasser, originally from Gdańsk, Poland, which has been produced since at least 1598, Goldstrike from Amsterdam, Goldwasser from Schwabach in Germany, and the Swiss Goldschläger.

== See also ==
- Ormolu
- Dutch metal
- Dragée
- Tin(IV) sulfide
- Metal leaf
- Mosaic gold
- Goldene, a single-layer material made of gold atoms.
