= Criterion Theatre =

West End theatre in London

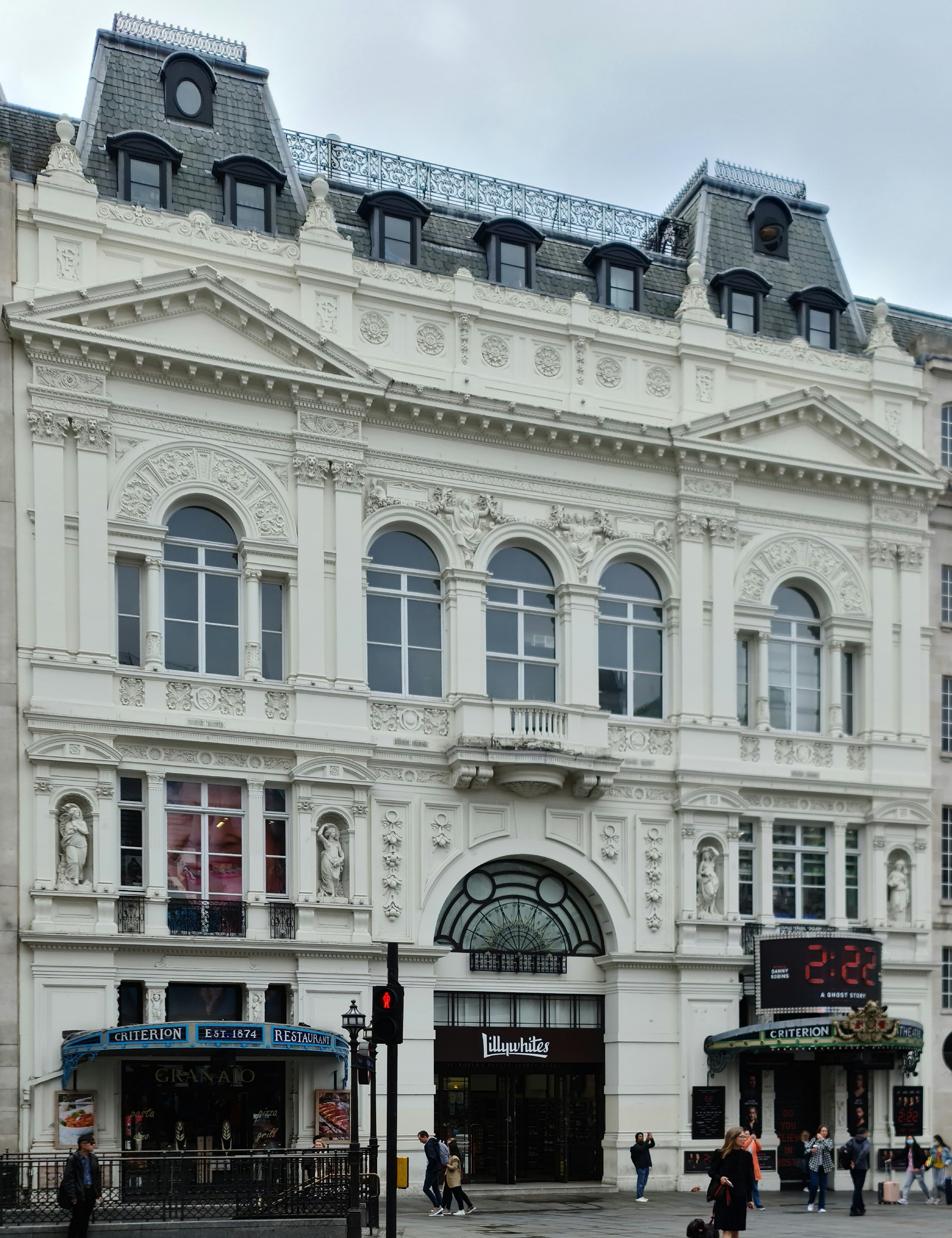
- The Criterion Theatre in 2022
- Interactive map of Criterion Theatre
- Address: Jermyn Street; London, SW1; United Kingdom
- Coordinates: 51.5098°N 0.1341°W
- Owner: Bourne Capital
- Operator: Criterion Theatre Trust
- Capacity: 588 on 3 levels
- Type: West End theatre
- Designation: Grade II*
- Production: Titanique
- Public transit: Piccadilly Circus

Construction
- Opened: 21 March 1874; 152 years ago
- Architect: Thomas Verity

Website
- www.criterion-theatre.co.uk

The Criterion Theatre is a West End theatre at Piccadilly Circus in the City of Westminster, and is a Grade II* listed building. It has a seating capacity of 588.

== Building the theatre ==
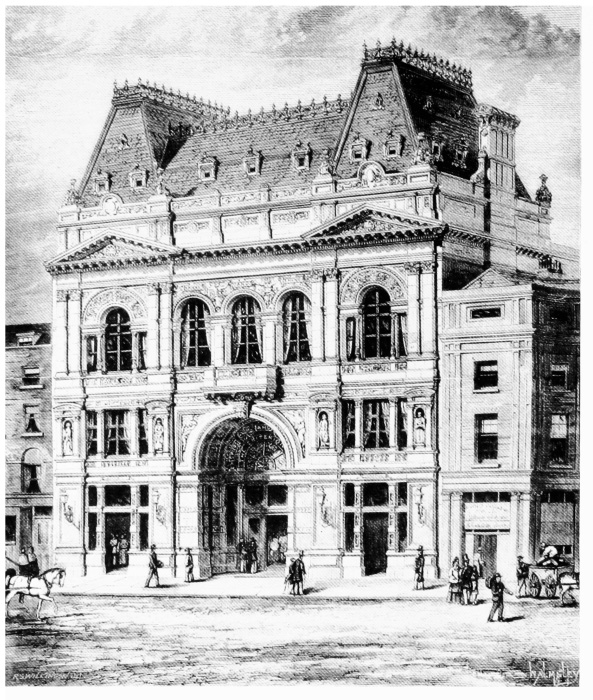
The façade as designed in 1873

In 1870, the caterers Spiers and Pond began development of the site of the White Bear, a seventeenth-century posting inn. The inn was located on sloping ground stretching between Jermyn Street and Piccadilly Circus, known as Regent Circus. A competition was held for the design of a concert hall complex, with Thomas Verity winning out of 15 entries. He was commissioned to design a large restaurant, dining rooms, ballroom, and galleried concert hall in the basement. The frontage, which was the façade of the restaurant, showed a French Renaissance influence using Portland stone.

After the building work began, it was decided to change the concert hall into a theatre. The composers' names, which line the tiled staircases, were retained and can still be seen. The redesign placed the large Criterion Restaurant and dining rooms above the theatre, with a ballroom on the top floor.

When Spiers and Pond applied for a licence to operate, the authorities were unhappy because the theatre was underground and lit by gas, creating the risk of toxic fumes. The Metropolitan Board of Works had to vote twice before the necessary licence was issued, and fresh air had to be pumped into the auditorium to prevent the audience from being asphyxiated. It was not until October 1881, at the Savoy, that the first theatre was lit electrically.

The building was completed in 1873 with the interior decoration carried out by W. B. Simpson & Sons.

== Early years ==
The first production opened on 21 March 1874 under the management of Henry J. Byron & EP Hingston. The programme consisted of An American Lady written and performed by Byron and a piece by W. S. Gilbert, with music by Alfred Cellier, entitled Topsyturveydom. The event apparently did not make much of an impression on Gilbert. In a 1903 letter to Thomas Edgar Pemberton, author of the book on The Criterion, Gilbert wrote: "I am sorry to say that in my mind is an absolute blank to the opening of The Criterion. I never saw Topseyturveydom. If you happen to have a copy of it and could lend it to me for a few hours it might suggest some reminiscences: as it is I don't even know what the piece was about!" Gilbert had, however, been back at the theatre in 1877 with his farce, On Bail (a revised version of his 1874 work, Committed for Trial); in 1881, with another farce, Foggerty's Fairy; and in 1892, with a comic opera, Haste to the Wedding, with music by George Grossmith (an operatic version of Gilbert's 1873 play, The Wedding March). Haste to the Wedding was a flop, but it introduced the 18-year-old George Grossmith, Jr., the composer's son, to the London stage. The younger Grossmith would go on to become a major star in Edwardian musical comedies.

Charles Wyndham became the manager and lessee in 1875, and under his management the Criterion became one of the leading light comedy houses in London. The first production under the manager was The Great Divorce Case, opening on 15 April 1876. When Wyndham left in 1899 to open his own theatre, Wyndham's Theatre (and then the New Theatre, now called the Noël Coward Theatre, in 1903) he remained the lessee bringing in various managements and their companies.

In March 1883, the theatre closed for alterations demanded by the Metropolitan Board of Works. The pumping of fresh air into the ten-year-old auditorium, some thirty feet below street level, was deemed unsatisfactory. Thomas Verity supervised the alterations (Verity by now had also designed the Comedy Theatre in 1881 and the Empire Theatre in 1882). The new direct access ventilation shaft meant cutting off a considerable portion of the adjoining Criterion Restaurant. New corridors were built, with several new exits. The auditorium was reconstructed and the stage re-equipped. The old dressing rooms were demolished and new ones built. Most importantly, electricity was installed. Dramatic Notes (1884) states "The Criterion Theatre, transformed from a stuffy band-box to a convenient, handsome, and well ventilated house, reopened on April 16". Further alterations and redecorations took place in 1902–03, when the theatre was closed for seven months.

== 20th century ==
Between the world wars, productions included Musical Chairs with John Gielgud and in 1936, French Without Tears which ran for 1,039 performances and launched the writing career of Terence Rattigan.

During the Second World War, the Criterion was requisitioned by the BBC – as an underground theatre it made an ideal studio safe from the Blitz – and light entertainment programmes were both recorded and broadcast live.

After the war, the Criterion repertoire included avant-garde works such as Samuel Beckett's Waiting for Godot. The early part of 1956 saw the arrival of Anouilh's popular comedy, The Waltz of the Toreadors, with impressive performances by Hugh Griffith and Beatrix Lehmann.

In the 1970s, the Criterion site was proposed for redevelopment, which caused protest, as people feared the theatre would be lost. In February 1975, the GLC Planning Committee approved the development on the condition that the theatre continued in "full, continuous and uninterrupted use" while the redevelopments took place. Throughout the 1970s and early 1980s the argument increased, and the Equity Save London's Theatre Committee organised high-profile demonstrations (campaigners included John Gielgud, Marius Goring, Edward Woodward, Diana Rigg, Robert Morley and Prunella Scales) as they feared that the theatre would still be lost.

In the 1980s, the theatre building was purchased by Robert Bourne, a property tycoon and patron of the arts, and his wife, theatre impresario Sally Greene. The couple set up the Criterion Theatre Trust, a registered charity created to protect the Criterion's future. From 1989 to 1992 the theatre was renovated both in the back and front of the house. During that time, the block that exists today was built around it. After the refurbishment, the Criterion retains a well-preserved Victorian auditorium with an intimate atmosphere. Major productions in the last two decades of the century included Tom Foolery (1980–1981), Can't Pay? Won't Pay! (1981–1983), and the long-running Run for Your Wife (1983–1989).

== 1996 to present ==
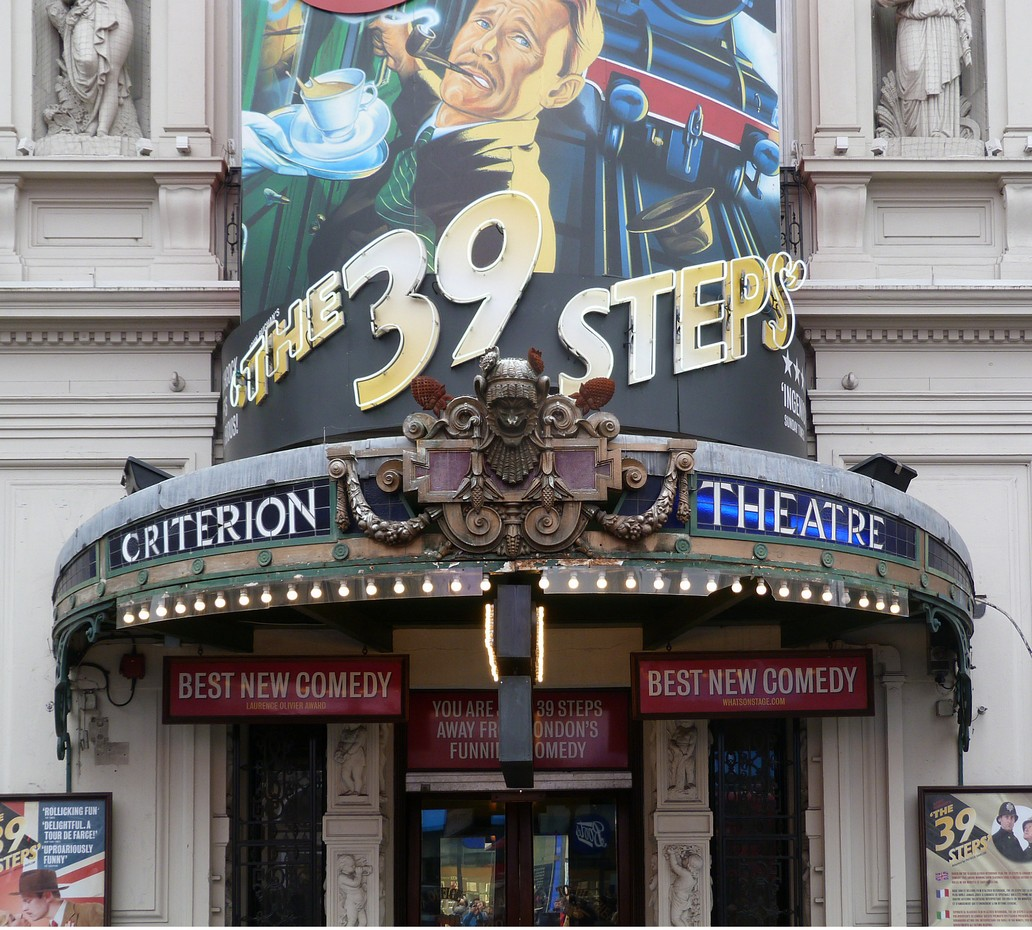
Detail of the entrance canopy in 2015

From 1996 to 2005, the theatre was home to productions of the Reduced Shakespeare Company, notably The Complete Works of William Shakespeare (Abridged).

From 2006 to 2015, the Criterion hosted the long-running melodrama The 39 Steps, adapted by Patrick Barlow from John Buchan's 1915 novel, which was adapted for film by Alfred Hitchcock (1935). In 2016 Mischief Theatre's The Comedy About a Bank Robbery opened. It played its final performance on 15 March 2020 due to the COVID-19 pandemic. More than a year later, the musical Amélie reopened the theatre on 20 May 2021 running until September. The first production after that to run at the theatre for at least a year is Titanique, which began previews on 9 December 2024, with an official opening on 9 January 2025. It is scheduled to play until January 2027.
