= 15 Old Bailey =

Hotel building in London

General information
- Type: Hotel
- Architectural style: French Renaissance
- Location: London, England
- Coordinates: 51°30′59″N 0°06′10″W
- Completed: 1874

Design and construction
- Architect: Evans Cronk

Listed Building – Grade II
- Official name: 1-8, HOLBORN VIADUCT EC1, 15, OLD BAILEY EC1
- Designated: 22 July 1988
- Reference no.: 1375723

15 Old Bailey also addressed 1–8 Holborn Viaduct is a Grade II listed hotel building in the City of London.

== History and description ==
The building was completed in 1874 to designs by Evans Cronk for hotelier partners Felix William Spiers and Christopher Pond who owned a number of major hotels and by 1913 had their headquarters on nearby New Bridge Street. The hotel is built to a French Renaissance or Second Empire design reflecting that popularised in hotel architecture by the Grosvenor Hotel in Victoria completed in 1862. It is built of a cream brick with tall slate mansard punctuated by decorated dormers with red stone detailing.

The same year the neighbouring Holborn Viaduct Station Hotel was completed in a similar style and also run by Spiers & Pond. It was demolished following Second World War bomb damage sustained in 1941.

The building underwent refurbishment in the 1980s by Rolfe Judd Group Practice for Friends Provident Life. Today, it is occupied by the Hyde Hotel London City.

== See also ==
- Old Bailey
- Britannia House
