= Criterion Restaurant =

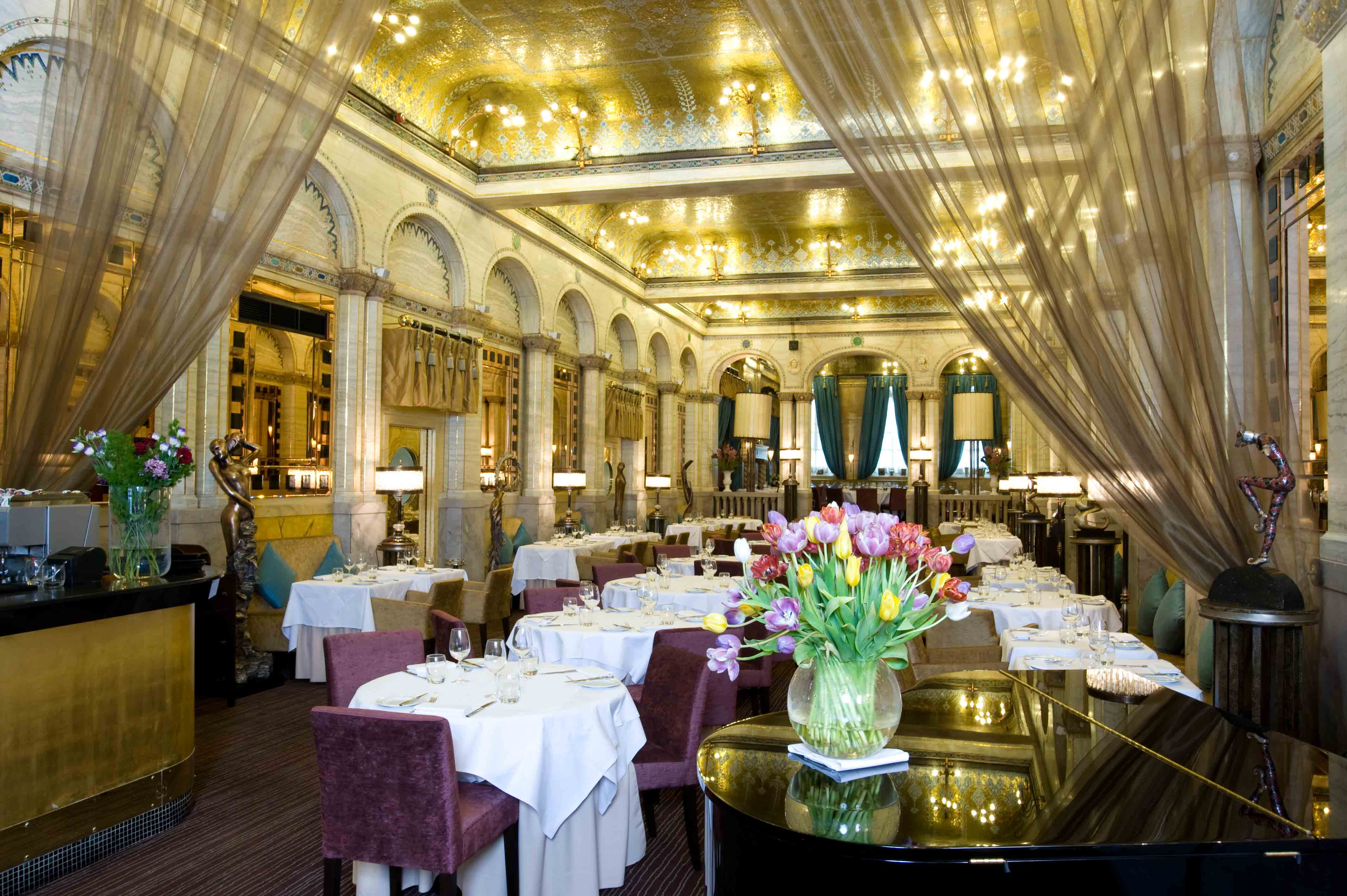
- Restaurant interior

- Location within Central London

Restaurant information
- Established: 1873
- Food type: haute cuisine
- Dress code: Smart casual
- Location: 224 Piccadilly, London, W1J 9HP, United Kingdom
- Coordinates: 51°30′36″N 0°8′3″W

The Criterion Restaurant is an opulent restaurant complex facing Piccadilly Circus in the heart of London. It was built by architect Thomas Verity in Neo-Byzantine style for the partnership Spiers and Pond, which opened it in 1873. Apart from fine dining facilities it has a bar. It is a Grade II* listed building and is among the most historic and oldest restaurants in the world. In the first Sherlock Holmes story, A Study in Scarlet, Dr. Watson is told of his prospective roommate after he meets a friend at the Criterion.

== History ==
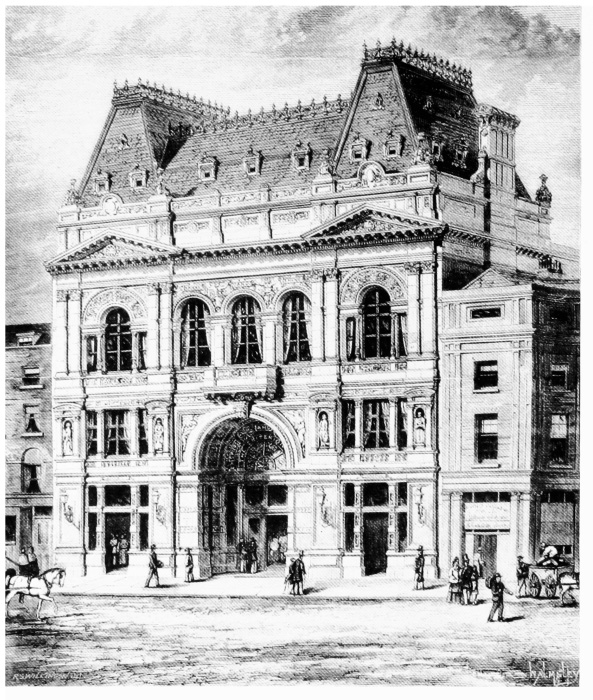
Criterion building with restaurant and theatre in 1873

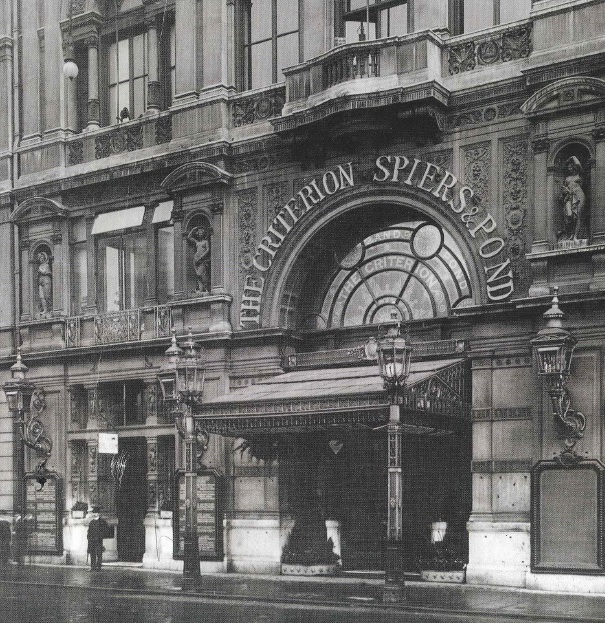
Criterion Restaurant, Piccadilly Circus, 26 October 1902

In 1870 the building agreement for Nos. 219–221 (consec.) Piccadilly and Nos. 8–9 Jermyn Street was purchased by Messrs. Spiers and Pond, a firm of wine merchants and caterers, who held a limited architectural competition for designs for a large restaurant and tavern with ancillary public rooms. The competition was won by architect Thomas Verity. Building work began in the summer of 1871, and was completed in 1873 at a total cost of over £80,000 (£8 million adjusted for inflation). The contractors included Messrs. Hill, Keddell and Waldram and Messrs. George Smith and Company.

It was designed by Thomas Verity as a five-level complex with its Marble Hall and Long Bar on the ground floor; dining rooms on the first and second floors; a ballroom on the third floor and a theatre in the basement. It also had an American Bar, which some view as the first American-style cocktail bar in London. The interiors of the new building were extensively decorated with ornamental tile-work, one of the first examples of the use of this material on such a scale following its successful use in the recently completed refreshment rooms at the South Kensington Museum (now the Victoria and Albert Museum).

The restaurant was opened on 17 November 1873. The new venture proved very profitable within a short time. The East Room was popular with ladies who had come to London's West End to shop.

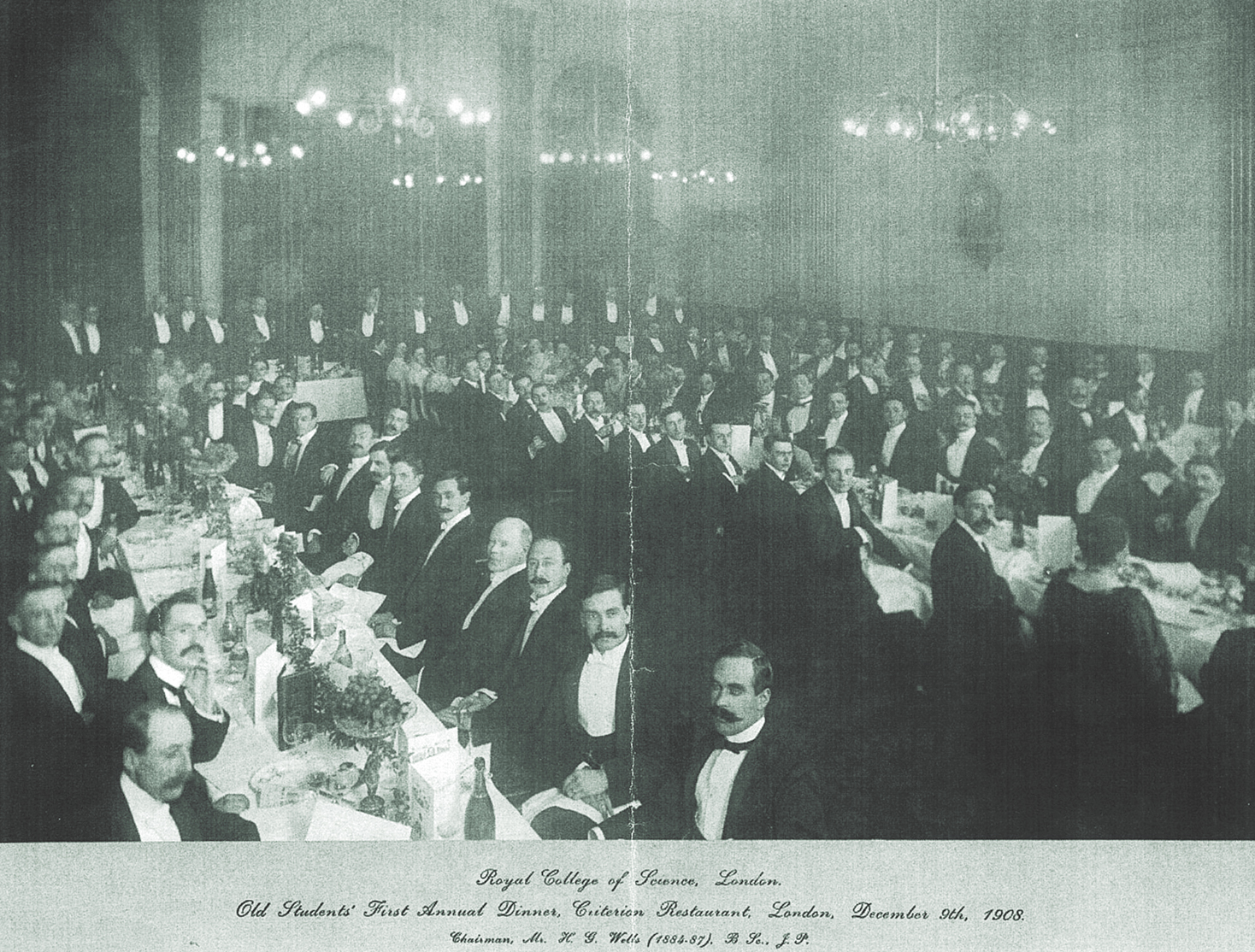
Royal College of Science Dinner at Criterion, 9 December 1908

The restaurant was a setting for many events and celebrations such as at the Royal College of Science's First Annual Dinner. The Chairman that night was H. G. Wells, the pioneer of science fiction. H. G. Wells was a regular diner at the restaurant. The Criterion was frequently used for luncheon clubs in the early 1920s. Members met for lunch every Thursday at 1pm and the price of lunch was 4s-6d. The first recorded lunch meeting was held on 6 December 1923. The speaker was a member, Miss Joyce Partridge, FRCS, surgeon and lecturer on anatomy. The list of guest speakers was impressive and varied, including Edgar Wallace, Sir Hugh Walpole, G. K. Chesterton and Bertrand Russell.

Suffragettes at the Criterion

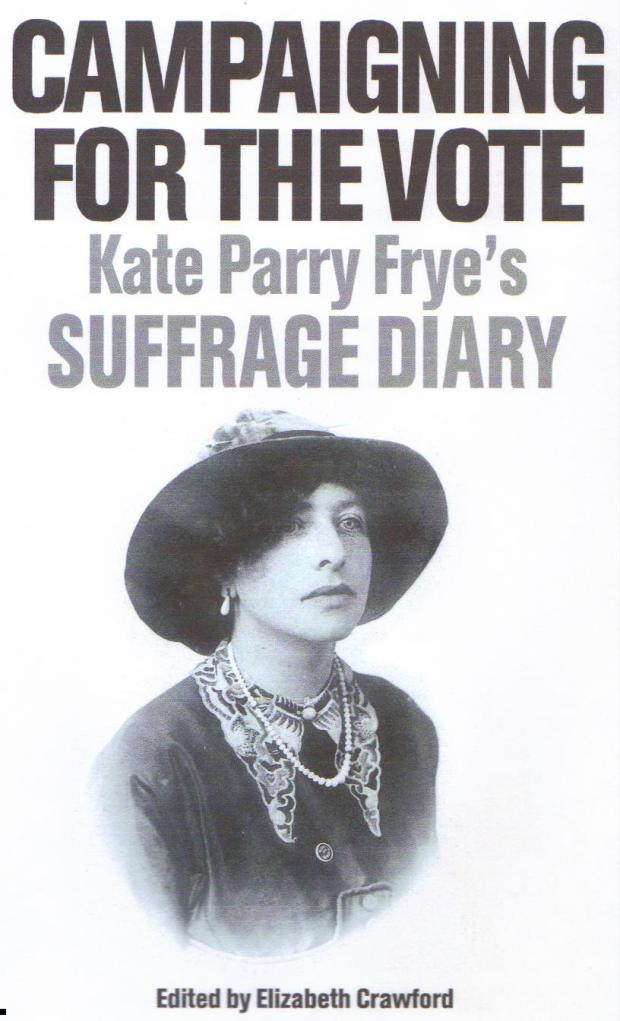
Kate Frye diary

In April 1909 the Criterion Restaurant, renowned for its afternoon tea and in particular high standard of ladies cloakrooms, was a setting for many afternoon tea meetings organised and held by the WSPU and Christabel Pankhurst as a part of Women's suffrage in the United Kingdom.

Kate Frye, who was a member of the Actresses' Franchise League, would frequently attend and make diary entries on some of those Criterion meetings.

Friday February 4th 1910. Started off about 1.45 for the Criterion Restaurant – went by bus. We went early as we wanted a good seat to see Miss Pankhurst. The place was packed before they began at 3 o’clock. Miss Granville took the chair and Miss Adeline Bourne as Secretary and Miss Maud Hoffman as Treasurer spoke in a more or less business-like fashion and Lt Col Sir something Turner spoke – an old dodderer. I could hardly keep my face straight he looked in such a loving fashion at the ladies but of course the thing of the afternoon was Christabel Pankhurst. She is a little wonder.

— Extract from Kate Frye's diary on Christabel Pankhurst.

David Lloyd George and Winston Churchill

In 1919, the Coalition government of David Lloyd George appeared to be in a position of overwhelming strength and public support. Lloyd George's personal reputation was known to be as the "man who won the war". Yet the government faced serious problems notably in the economy and with industrial unrest. More problematic was the stability of the Coalition as a governing platform. Lloyd George was aware that a purely personal ascendancy was unlikely to be enough for turning the Coalition into a long term political force. The only ways in which the wartime spirit of national unity could be perpetuated was by appealing to the ‘higher unity’ of coalition, with the creation of a single ‘fused’ party to reflect the ‘fusion’ taking place at parliamentary and programme level. Between July 1919 and March 1920 Lloyd George and his associates worked hard to bring the fusion project to fruition. Winston Churchill set the tone on 15 July with a speech to the New Members’ Group at the Criterion Restaurant in London.

Party spirit, party interest, party organisation, must, in these very serious times, be definitely subordinated to national spirit, national interests, and national organisation.

— Extract of Winston Churchill's speech in Criterion Restaurant, 15 July 1919 .

Mosley and His Inner Circle.

On two occasions after the outbreak of World War 2 various fascists leaders met here under the watch of MI5. Present were BUF leader Sir Oswald Mosley, Admiral Barry Domvile, Lady Domvile, also wealthy financial backers such as Percy Thomas Lovely, who was afterward interned. The 'Information and Policy' meetings were held on 1 March and 30 April 1940.

== Architecture ==
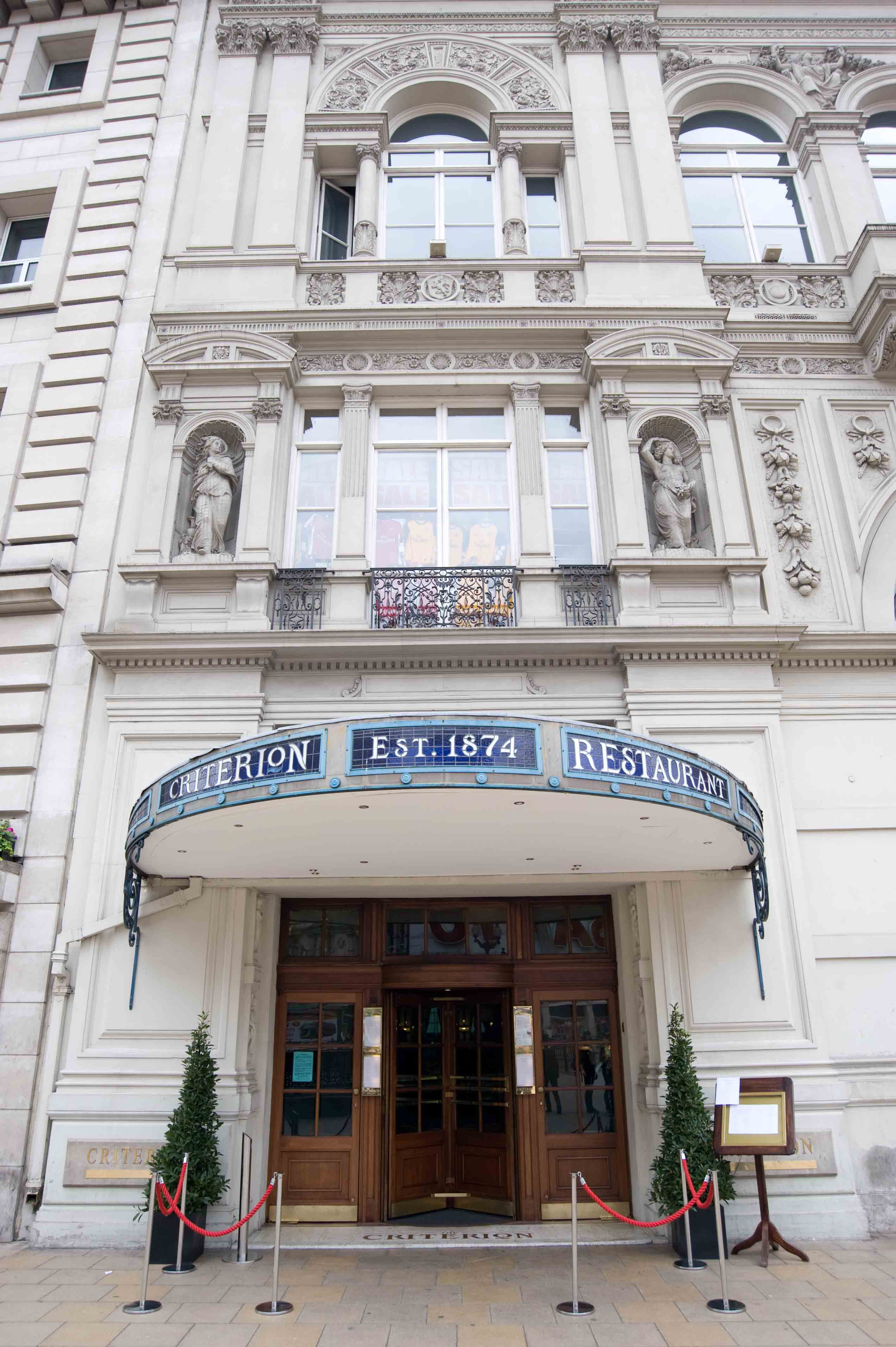
Front entrance with ionic half-columns and draped female figures

The Criterion Restaurant's front may still be regarded as the best surviving work of Thomas Verity, a leading theatre architect of his day.

The Second Empire masterpieces of Charles Garnier—the Paris Opera House and the Monte Carlo Casino —seem to have influenced Verity's design, which is carried out in stone, now painted, and is composed of a central face slightly recessed between wings, all similar in width and three storeys high.

As originally completed, however, the first two storeys of the central face contained a great round-arched opening forming the deeply recessed entrance to the restaurant. In each wing the first two storeys have three-bay openings, wide between narrow, flanked by wide piers.

In the ground storey these piers are plain, but those above are dressed with segmental-pedimented niches containing statues. A pedestal, with enriched panels in its die, underlines the lofty third storey where the central face has a group of three round-arched windows, their moulded archivolts rising from entablatures above plain piers flanked by Ionic half-columns.

Carved in the spandrels are draped female figures, holding festoons looped below oblong tablets. In each of the wings paired Corinthian plain-shafted pilasters flank an Ionic Venetian window, its arched middle light being of the same size as those in the central face, with a fan-shaped lunette of wide and narrow panels, the former ornamented and the latter plain.

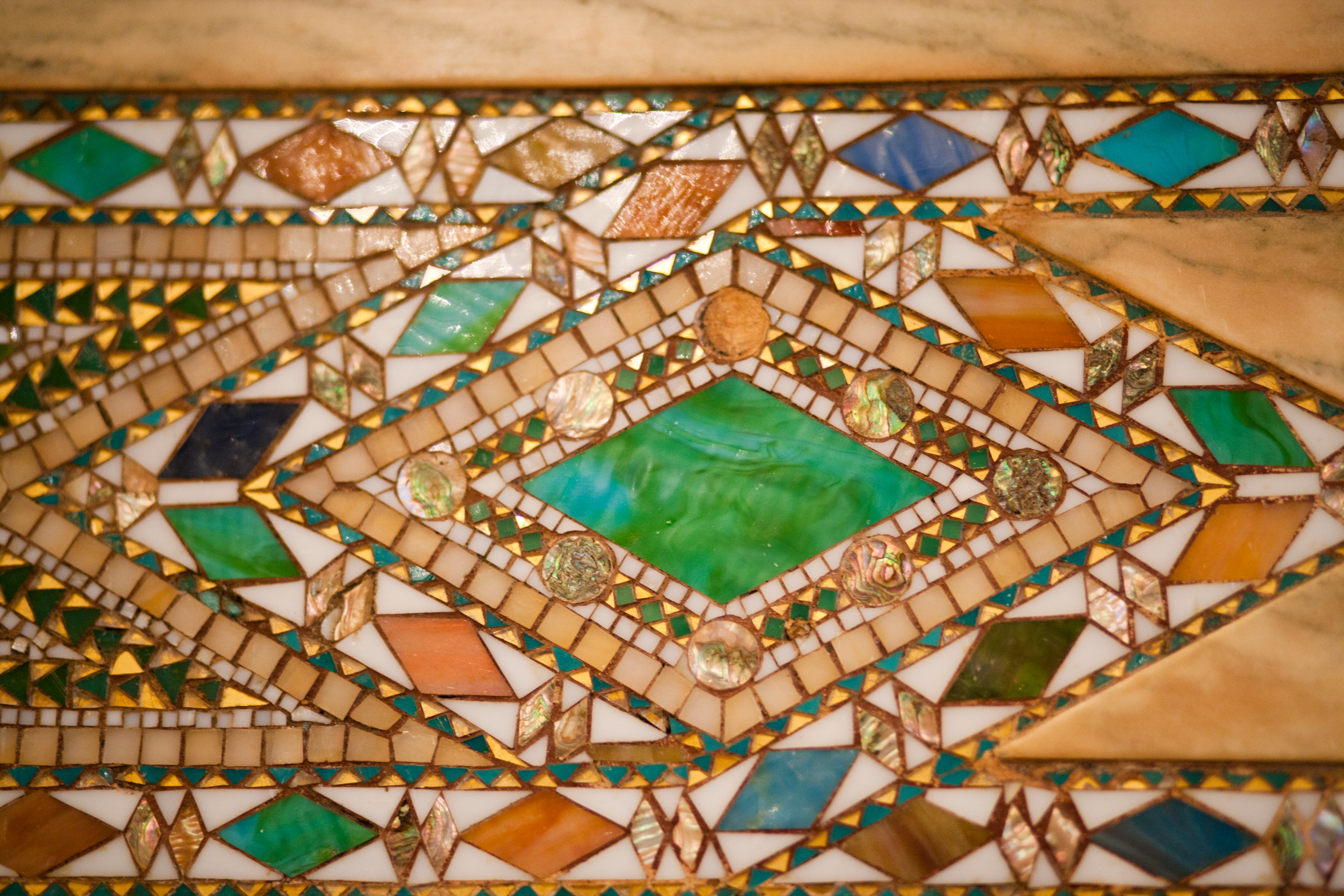
Restaurant incorporates semi-precious stones such as jade, mother of pearl, turquoise.

The main entablature has an enriched architrave, a plain frieze except for the carved panels in the breaks above the Corinthian pilasters, and a dentilled and modillioned cornice which is returned to form large triangular pediments over the two wings.

The high pedestal-parapet, its die enriched with ornamented panels, is a typically French feature, and so are the high pavilion roofs over the wings, with two tiers of dormers. These, and the single-storey roof over the centre, are crested with railings of ornamental ironwork.

One of the restaurant's most famous features is the Long Bar, which retains the 'glistering' ceiling of gold mosaic, coved at the sides and patterned all over with lines and ornaments in blue and white tesserae.

The wall decoration accords well with the real yellow gold leaf ceiling, being lined with warm marble and formed into blind arcades with semi-elliptical arches resting on slender octagonal columns, their unmolded capitals and the impost being encrusted with gold-ground mosaic.

== Reception ==
Under the ownership of Georgian entrepreneur Irakli Sopromadze, in July 2009 Marina O'Loughlin reviewed the restaurant for Metro, saying that "The Criterion is the star of the show", but criticised the "dodgy oligarch taste: the crushed-red velvet love seats, the metal statues that look like they’ve been liberated from TK Maxx, the unflattering lighting". O'Loughlin felt the food was "infinitely better than the food we endured during Marco Pierre White's reign". Giles Coren from The Times reviewed the restaurant using his Twitter account awarding his overall experience a mark of 8/10. The Criterion won the "Best London Restaurant 2011" award having been voted in at first place by the dining community.

In December 2015 restaurant has reopened as Savini at Criterion serving an all day classical Milanese menu until 2018 when the restaurant reopened under the Granaio brand.

== Ownership ==
In 1992, after extensive refurbishment, the room was re-opened under the management of Bob Payton's My Kinda Town Restaurant Group as The Criterion Brasserie. My Kinda Town ran the restaurant until July 1995 when the lease was taken by Marco Pierre White who arranged for it to be refurbished by top interior designer, David Collins.

In 2009 Criterion Restaurant was bought by Irakli Sopromadze of VINS Holdings carrying out a "gentle and sympathetic" restoration of the venue including the refurbishment of the premises and upgrading of the kitchen and equipment. Irakli Sopromadze relaunched the restaurant in May 2009 and planned to acquire other restaurant opportunities in central London.

In June 2015, decision was made to place the restaurant into administration following a rent review decision resulting in 60% rental uplift.

In December 2015, the Gatto family, owner of the Savini Restaurant in Galleria Vittorio Emanuele II in Milan, reopened the restaurant with the name of Savini At Criterion.

The Savini restaurant closed on 27 June 2018, with a planned reopening as part of the Granaio chain at the end of July 2018.

In May 2021, Granaio at Criterion has been taken over by the building's landlord Criterion Capital from the Gatto family, who had reportedly vacated the premises.

Masala Zone, Piccadilly Circus opened in the Criterion building in 2023.

== Literary references ==
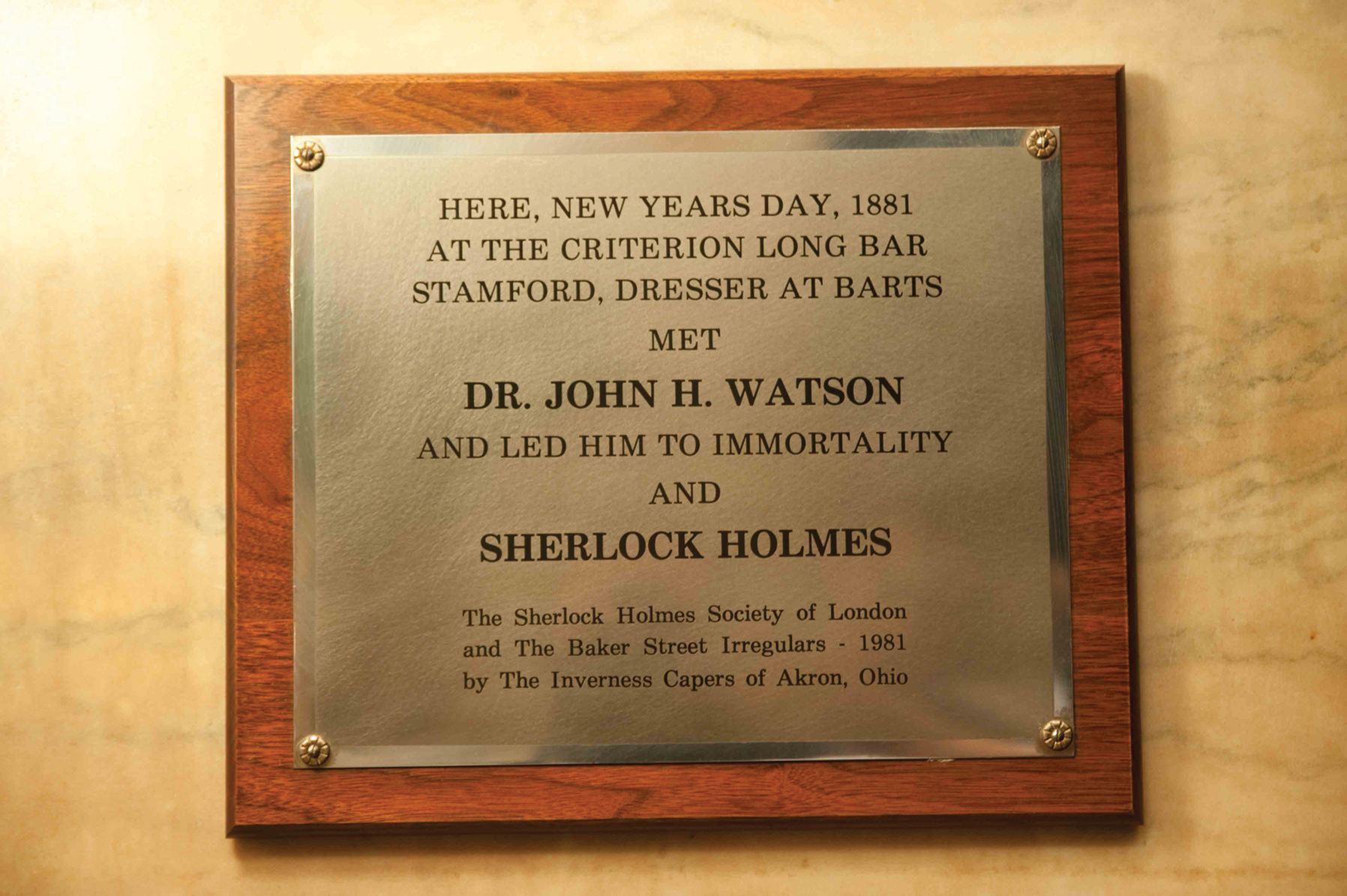
A plaque displayed at the Criterion Restaurant

In the first Sherlock Holmes story, A Study in Scarlet, Dr. Watson is told of his prospective roommate after he meets a friend at the Criterion, "I was standing at the Criterion Bar, when some one tapped me on the shoulder, and turning round I recognized young Stamford, who had been a dresser under me at Barts."

A plaque commemorating this event was placed there in 1953.

The Criterion Bar is one of only two establishments permitted to serve liquor in G.K. Chesterton's 1914 novel, The Flying Inn.

The British opium addict Grosely recalls yearning for the Criterion Bar in W. Somerset Maugham's short story "Mirage" from On a Chinese Screen (1922), where it represents the London of his youth, far from the squalid life he now leads in Haiphong.

In P G Wodehouse's short story Indian Summer of an Uncle (1930) Bertie Wooster's Uncle George is unexpectedly reunited with an old flame whom he met when she was a waitress at the Criterion.

== In popular culture ==
- Russell Crowe character Max Skinner meets up with his friend and real estate agent Charlie Willis (Tom Hollander) at Criterion Restaurant to discuss Max's plans for his vineyard estate in France in A Good Year.
- The Criterion was featured in The Dark Knight during the restaurant scene when Bruce Wayne tells his guests that he owns the restaurant when they questioned whether they be allowed to move tables together.
- The Criterion was the restaurant of choice in London Boulevard when Rob Gant (Ray Winstone) requests to meet Harry Mitchel (Colin Farrell) for dinner somewhere decent. When they meet at the restaurant Rob tries to force Harry to work for him, however he refuses and storms out but not before throwing cash on the table for the steak he ordered.
- In the film Gambit, a pair of art hustlers Harry Deane (Colin Firth) and PJ Puznowski (Cameron Diaz) are having a dinner with Harry's abusive boss Lord Shabandar (Alan Rickman), who introduces PJ to Martin Zaidenweber (Stanley Tucci). He tells PJ that Martin has been assigned to curate his private collection.
- In the fourth series of Downton Abbey character Lady Edith Crawley (Laura Carmichael) meets Michael Gregson (Charles Edwards) at the Criterion for dinner. She tells Michael that she never could have eaten at a public restaurant before the war, although her mother would allow the Ritz on very rare occasions. She remarks that she loves the Criterion. While they are here Edith and Michael share their first kiss.
- In Last Night In Soho, a photo of Eloise (Thomasin McKenzie) and her mother shows the Restaurant in background.

== See also ==
- Criterion Reviver cocktail
