= Britannia House =

Office block in London, England

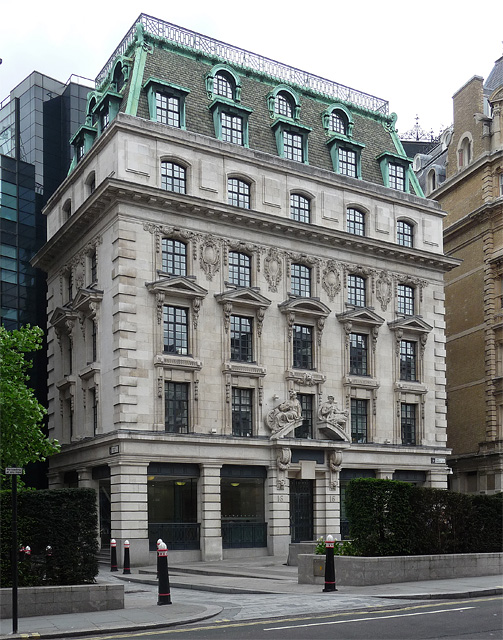
- Britannia House

General information
- Type: Office
- Architectural style: Edwardian
- Location: London, England
- Coordinates: 51°30′58″N 0°06′09″W
- Completed: 1920

Design and construction
- Architect: Arthur Frederick Usher

Listed Building – Grade II
- Official name: Britannia House
- Designated: 10 May 1990
- Reference no.: 1251982

Britannia House is a Grade II listed Edwardian office block on Old Bailey in the City of London.

== Description ==
Britannia House was built between 1912 to 1920 to the design of Arthur Frederick Usher for the London, Chatham and Dover Railway close to their Holburn Viaduct terminus. The building is built of Portland stone to an Edwardian Baroque design with French influences. The roof is a high mansard of Westmorland slate with copper detailing. Above the doorway are allegorical sculptures representing rail and sea travel.

Between 2019 and 2021 the building's interior was refurbished by Orms, retaining the historic facade.

== See also ==
- 15 Old Bailey
