= Kanazawa Yasue Gold Leaf Museum =

Museum in Kanazawa, Ishikawa, Japan

- 金沢市立安江金箔工芸館
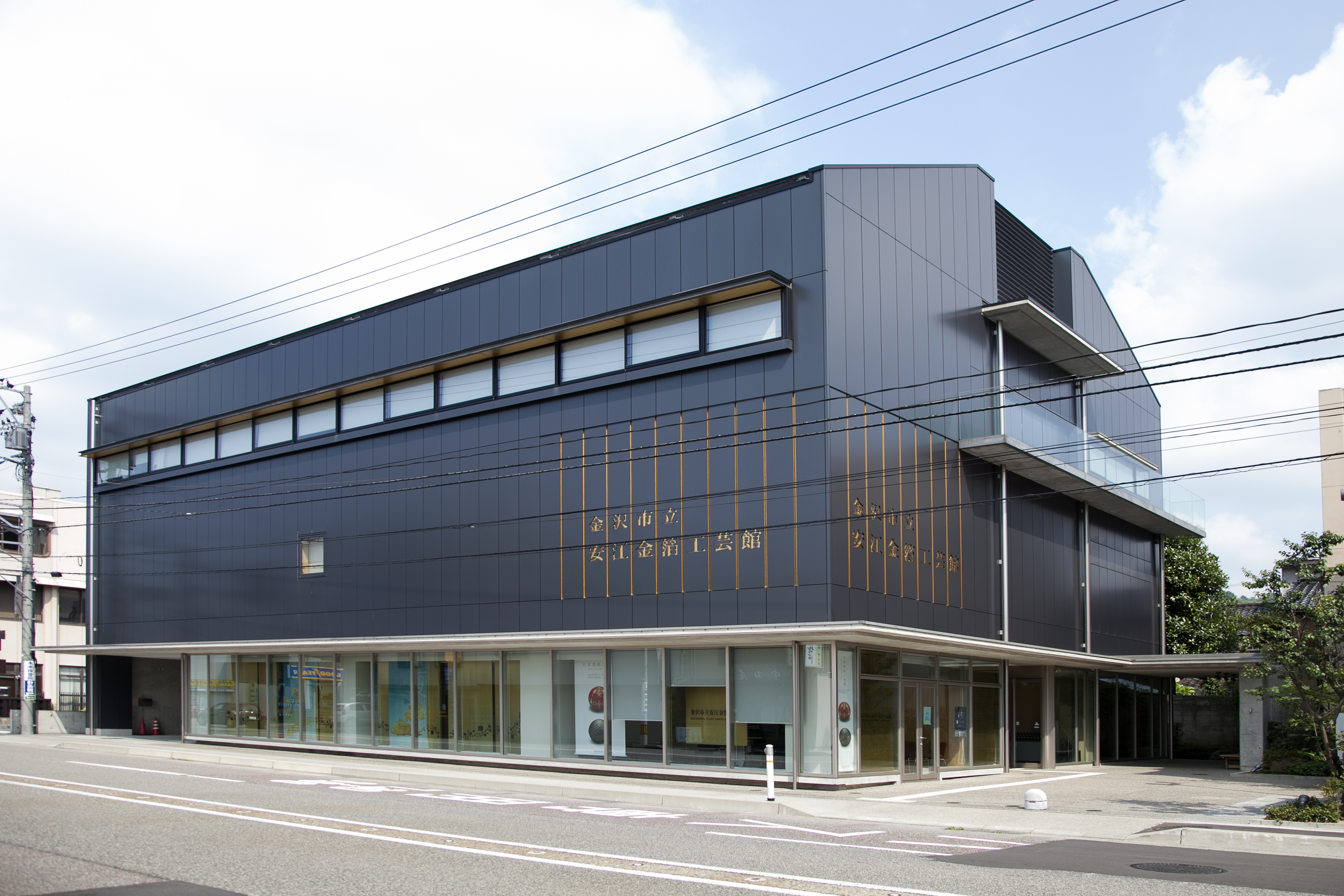
- Established: 1974 (original building); 2010 (current building)
- Location: Kanazawa, Ishikawa, Japan
- Coordinates: 36°34′25.5″N 136°39′57.4″E
- Type: museum
- Collection size: 300
- Founder: Yasue Takaaki
- Owner: Kanazawa City Government
- Parking: no
- Website: Official website

The Kanazawa Yasue Gold Leaf Museum (Japanese: 金沢市立安江金箔工芸館) is a museum about gold leaf in Kanazawa, Ishikawa Prefecture, Japan.

== History ==
The museum was originally founded in 1974 by a local craftsman Yasue Takaaki in Kitayasue as a private museum named Yasue Gold Leaf Museum. The museum and all of its artifacts were donated to Kanazawa City Government in 1985 and subsequently renamed to Kanazawa Yasue Gold Leaf Museum. In 2010, the museum was relocated to Higashiyama by the city government due to the area close connection to gold leaf.

== Architecture ==
The museum building was built on a 758 m^{2} area of land. It consists of 3 floors with a total floor area of 1,393 m^{2}. The ground floor consists of library, multipurpose exhibition hall, office and outdoor information center with a total area of 498 m^{2}. The upper floor consists of permanent exhibition area, rest area, temporary exhibition area and video area with a total area of 444 m^{2}. The top floor consists of seminar room and Kanazawa-Haku Research Center with a total area of 438 m^{2}. The museum building was designed following the traditional Kanazawa storehouses embedded with gold leaf on its exterior wall. The Kanazawa-Haku Research Center is dedicated to the study of metal leaf industry in Kanazawa.

== Exhibitions ==
The museum exhibits around 300 pieces of gold leaf artworks, history of gold leaf in Kanazawa, gold leaf production process and tools involved in its process. Artifacts consist of works from the early period of Japan, Edo period and present day. Exhibits include folding screens, Kaga incrustation work, Kaga lacquer work, Kanazawa Buddhist altar, Kutani porcelain, Noh costumes etc.

== Transportation ==
The museum is accessible within walking distance from right loop bus stop #4 or left loop bus stop #11 departing from Kanazawa Station of West Japan Railway Company.

== See also ==
- List of museums in Japan
