= Thomas Verity =

English architect

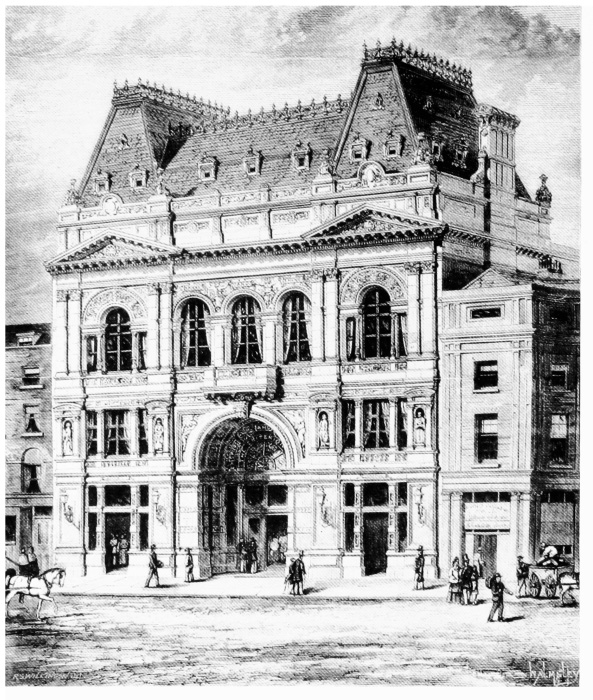
Entrance to the Criterion Theatre and Restaurant (1874), Piccadilly Circus

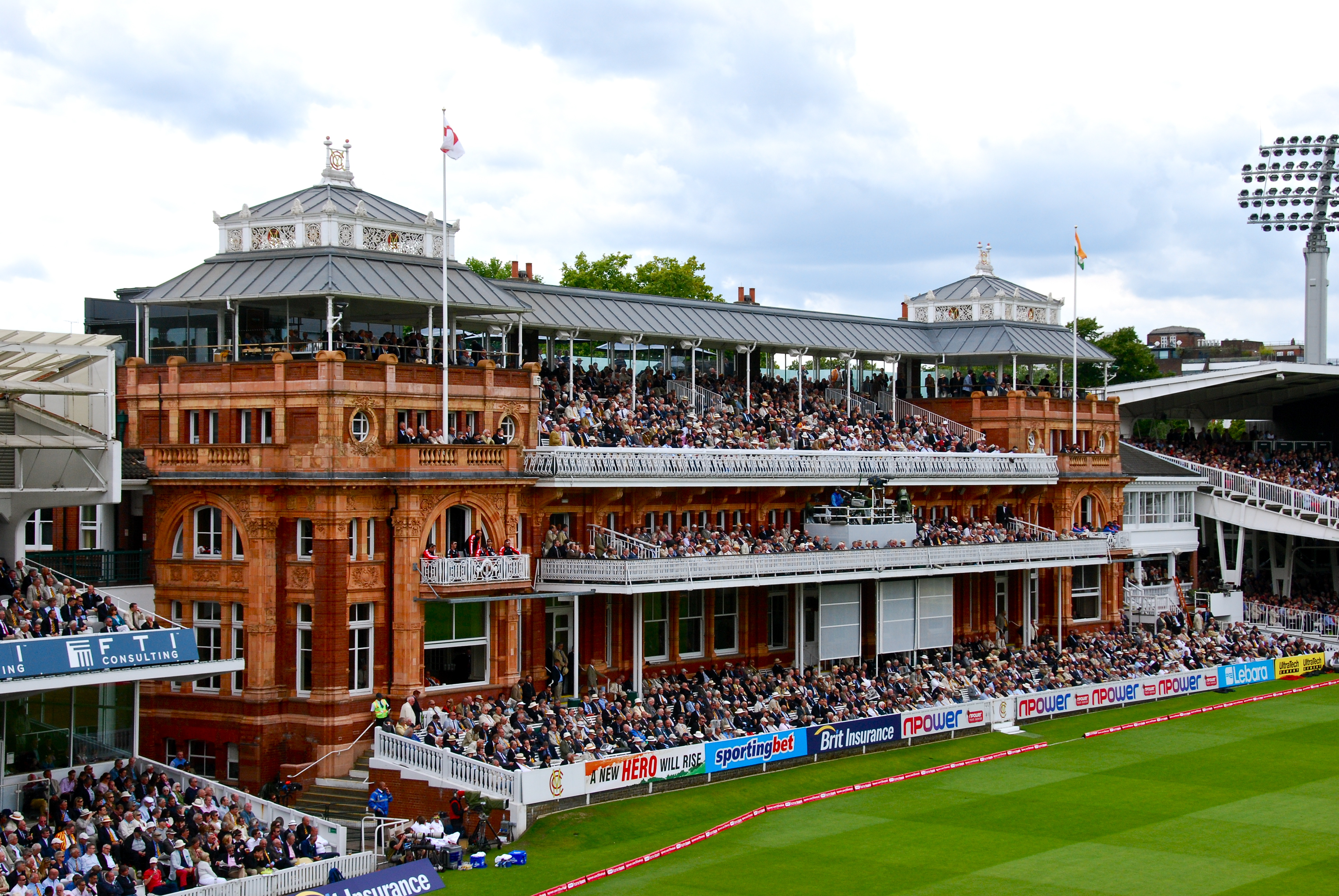
The Pavilion, Lord's Cricket Ground

Thomas Verity (1837–1891) was an English theatre architect during the theatre-building boom of 1885–1915.

Verity began his career articled in the architecture department of the War Office, assisting in the erection of the South Kensington Museum. He further assisted in the building of the Royal Albert Hall between 1867 and 1870.

In 1870, he won an open competition to build the Criterion Theatre and Criterion Restaurant for the caterers Spiers and Pond, founding his own architectural practice. Other London theatres for which he was engaged included the Royalty Theatre, the Novelty Theatre, the Folly Theatre, the Scala Theatre, and the Comedy Theatre. In 1878, he was appointed consulting architect to the Lord Chamberlain's office. This was initially in partnership with G. H. Hunt, but later with his son, Frank Verity, who received his training in his father's firm.

Both Veritys bought an interest in ornate Second Empire–style architecture to their early buildings, developing this into grand Beaux Arts in their later works. Many of the surviving buildings have achieved recognition in the late 20th century, becoming listed for their architectural significance.

Lord's Pavilion, with its famous Long Room, at Lord's Cricket Ground was built in 1889–1890 to Verity's designs. This historic landmark, a Grade II*-listed building, underwent an £8 million refurbishment programme in 2004–05.

Frank Verity continued the practice on his father's death, and Sam Beverley, his son-in-law, joined the practice in the 1920s, which remains active today. The company designed many cinemas, attaining a Royal Institute of British Architects bronze medal for the Shepherd's Bush Pavilion cinema in 1930.
