= Felix William Spiers =

British restaurateur and hotelier

Felix William Spiers (born London, England 1832, died Paris, France 1911) was a British restaurateur and hotelier.

Spiers' family originated in Glasgow, Scotland in the very early 18th century. One of the family moved to France, where he dealt in tobacco. Later family members were born in Calais, Dunkerque, Boulogne, France and in England. After his death his wife, Constance Albertine Spiers, donated money to the town of Belle-Ile, an island off the coast of Brittany, for a lifeboat which was named after him. His father was Felix Theodore Benjamin Augustus Spiers, born at Calais, in 1797, a shipbroker and merchant, agent in London for the Bristol General Steam Navigation Company.

== Australia ==
In 1851 Felix William sailed to Melbourne to join the gold rush where he was a wine merchant, having acquired a publican's licence in 1857. He set up in business at George Coppin and Gustavus Brooke's Theatre Royal, Melbourne with George Hennelle, but Hennelle was badly injured by a falling Post Office wall in 1859 and replaced by 25 years old Christopher Pond who was a son of John Pond, a Customs Officer from Essex, England. They rented a room at the National Hotel in Melbourne which was later renamed in The Shakespeare Grill Room to serve food service for gold miners. Spiers was an accountant in their joint venture and Pond acted as a talented host. In 1858, together they formed a partnership, Spiers and Pond, running the Café de Paris at the Theatre Royal, later buying the lease of the Café from Coppin and Brooke. They brought French waiters and did all their management in a proper way so their shop was serving more than one thousand visitors a day. It was intended to have a collection of art works inside and to be a cultural centre of Melbourne of that time

They tried to bring Charles Dickens to Australia for his public reading but failed. In 1861, they brought to Melbourne the All-England Eleven to play a series of cricket matches. It was the first commercial sponsorship of cricket ever. Mementos of the tour are held in the MCC Museum at Lord's Cricket Ground at Marylebone, London. They also were the first to organize balloon flight in Australia.

== Back to London ==
Pond suffered an accident in 1862, and in 1863 they both returned to London, where they were soon running the Holborn Viaduct Hotel at 15 Old Bailey. They noticed that the catering at the railway in England was very poor organised and decided to develop it to improve the state. They began with the concession at the Metropolitan Railway's just-opened Farringdon Street Station where they sold "buns and other ready goods". Spiers and Pond concluded the catering "contract for the London, Chatham and Dover Railway in 1865". And in 1866 two first exquisite restaurants were opened at Ludgate Hill Station and another at Southend Victoria railway station. By the 1867 they managed "21 refreshment bars, including 18 on railways, and employed around 800 people". In 1874 they had built, and owned, the Criterion Theatre and Restaurant in London's Piccadilly Circus. The bar in this shop was a famous place and was connected with Sherlock Holmes. Their next shop, The Gaiety Theatre Restaurant at Aldwych in The Strand, London was opened in 1894. It became the office of Dickens where he produced the magazine Household Words. The partnership became Spiers and Pond Limited in 1882, after the death of Pond in 1881. On 15 May 1889 they catered for a celebration dinner hosted by the Metropolitan Railway for the opening for their extension to Chesham tube station.

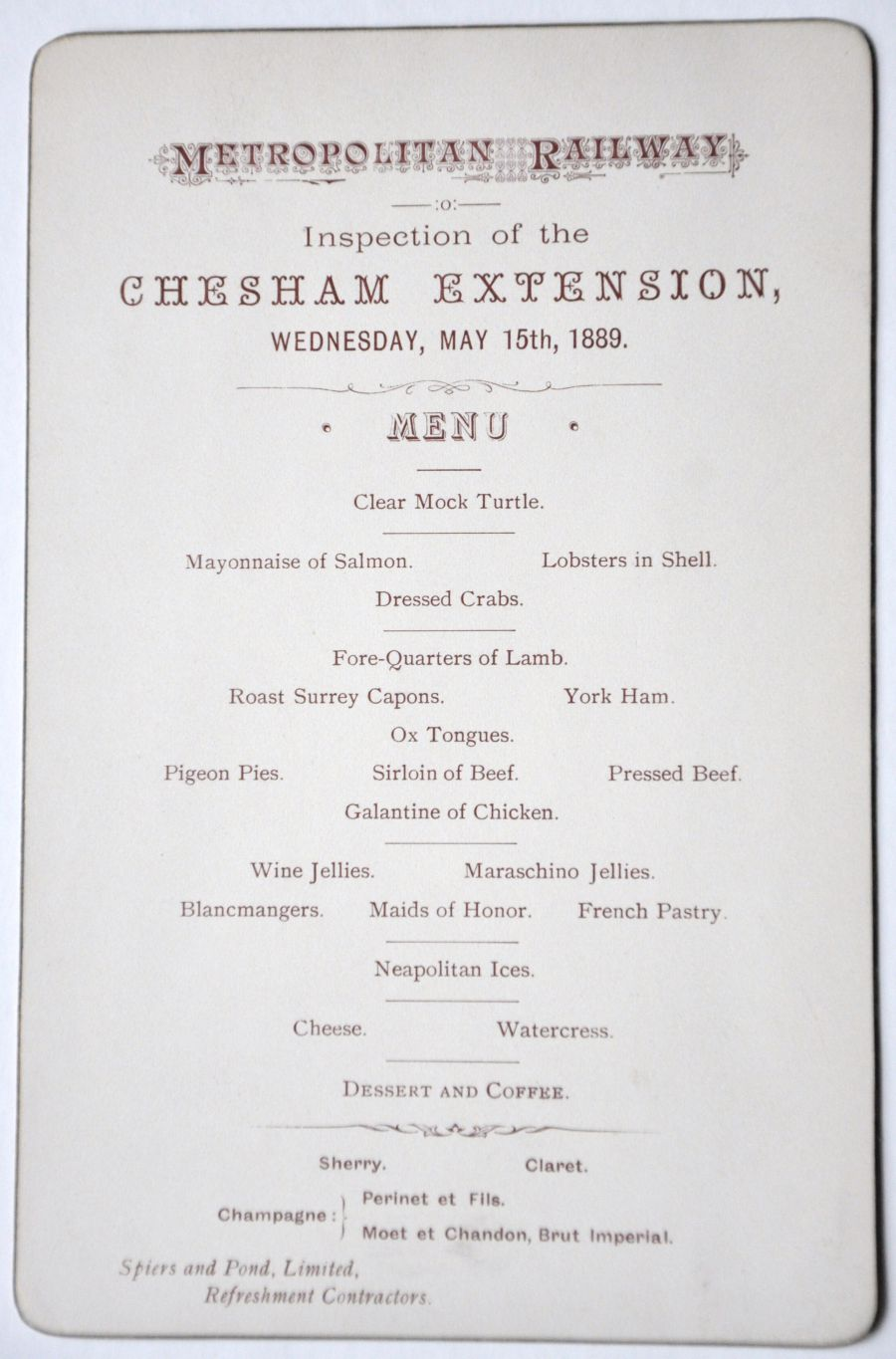
Celebration dinner menu for Metropolitan Railway extension to Chesham 15 May 1889 by Spiers & Pond Ltd.

They owned the London and Westminster Supply Association at New Bridge-street, Blackfriars, which supplied their restaurants, their extensive railway refreshment rooms, their many hotels and the general public. In early 1879 their Westminster Supply Association of New Bridge Street, London and Deane Street, Liverpool began issuing a mail order catalogue on a monthly subscription, The Housekeeper, which included interesting topics, cooking recipes and tips to housewives. The company went into liquidation in 1916 and was taken into administration by the court until 1918, when it was reorganized to continue as Spiers and Pond Limited. They owned twelve hotels, around twenty bars at London tube stations, and a golf course, Bushey Hall.

The hotels included Bailey's Hotel, Gloucester Road, London; the Grand Hotel, Brighton; the Queen's Hotel, Eastbourne; the Palace Hotel, Hastings; the Victoria Hotel; Manchester; the Grand Hotel, Scarborough; the Royal Clarence Hotel, Exeter; and the Bull's Head Hotel, Aylesbury. The company eventually became a part of Grand Metropolitan Hotels' portfolio.
