= Christopher Pond =

British caterer and hotelier

Christopher Pond (1826–1881) was a British caterer and hotelier.

Christopher Pond was born in Essex in 1826. While looking to seek his fortune in Australia he met Felix William Spiers, and the pair rented a room at the Melbourne National Hotel in which they created their first restaurant called "The Shakespeare Grill Room", catering for gold miners. They then created the Café de Paris in Melbourne, before moving into railway catering for the gold miners' Melbourne-Ballarat Railway during the 1850s.

Spiers & Pond organised the first tour of a national English cricket team to Australia during 1861/2, and were involved with the first balloon flight in Australia.

Returning to England, they pioneered railway catering to the UK, introducing it on the Metropolitan Railway and the London, Chatham and Dover Railway. They also created the Criterion Restaurant and theatre in Piccadilly, London. On 15 May 1889 they catered for a celebration dinner hosted by the Metropolitan Railway for the opening for their extension to Chesham tube station.

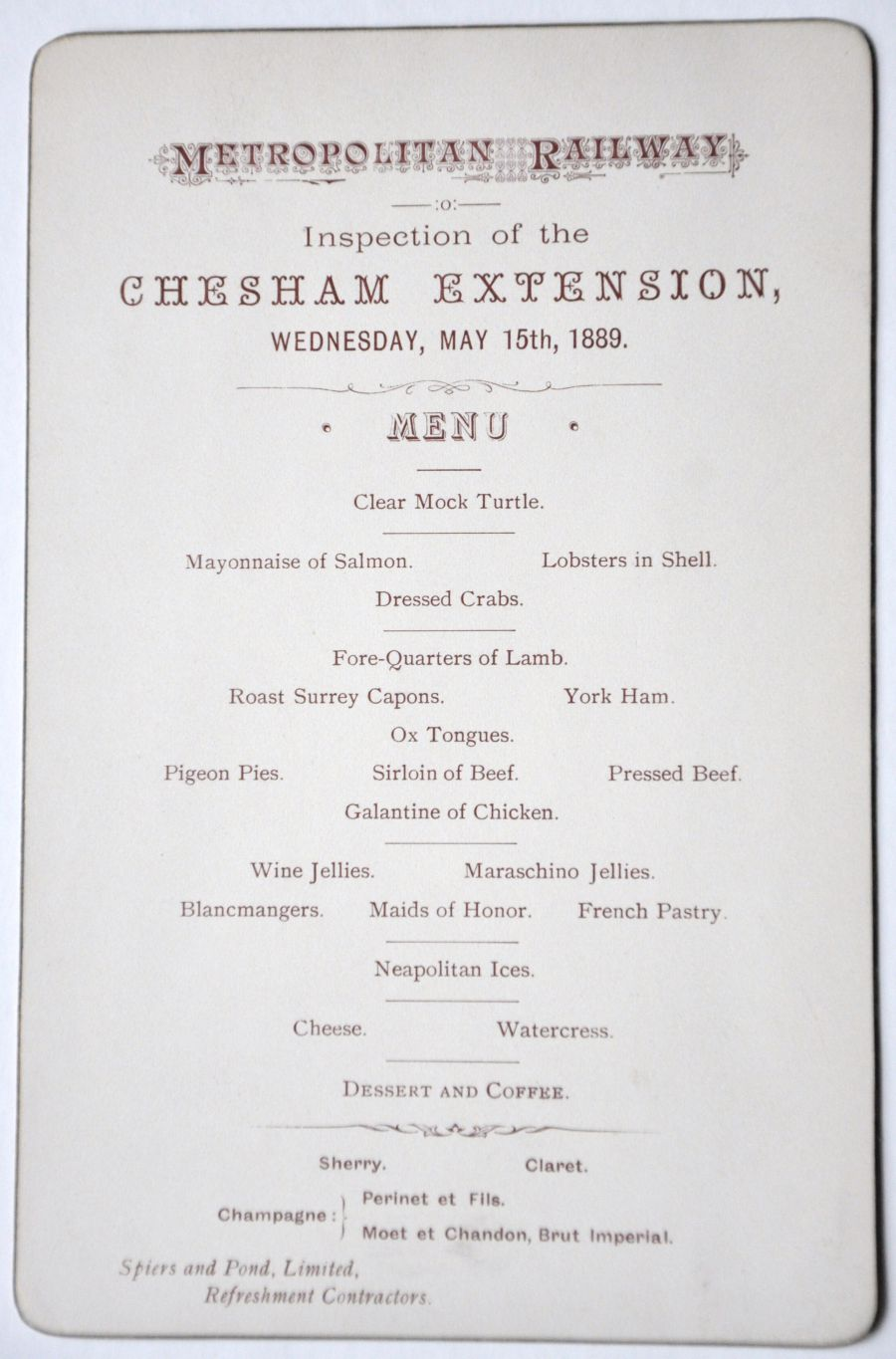
Celebration dinner menu for Metropolitan Railway extension to Chesham 15 May 1889 by Spiers & Pond Ltd.

Although he lived at Herne Hill, Pond died in Margate on 30 July 1881. He is buried in West Norwood Cemetery where his elaborate mausoleum is listed as Grade II.

Spiers and Pond's business continued successfully until 1957, owning a dozen restaurants including the Gaiety Theatre Restaurant in The Strand, the Grand Hotel, Brighton, catering at the Regents Park Zoo and the Theatre Royal, Drury Lane and a monthly mail order catering catalogue.
