= Allotropes of silicon =

Allotropes of silicon are structurally varied forms of silicon.

== Amorphous silicon ==
Amorphous silicon takes the form of a brown powder.

== Crystalline silicon ==
Crystalline silicon has a metallic luster and a grayish color. Single crystals can be grown with the Czochralski process. Crystalline silicon can be doped with elements such as boron, gallium, germanium, phosphorus or arsenic. Doped silicon is used in solid-state electronic devices, such as solar cells, rectifiers and computer chips.

Silicon crystallizes in the same pattern as germanium and diamond, viewable as two interpenetrating face-centered cubic primitive lattices. The cube measures 0.543 nm on a side.

=== Silicene ===
Silicene is a two-dimensional system with a hexagonal honeycomb structure similar to that of graphene. Silicene has different characteristics than graphene. It has a periodically buckled topology, interlayer coupling is much stronger, and its oxidized form, 2D silica, has a different chemical structure from graphene oxide. It was first created in 2010.

Penta-silicene is a two-dimensional system with pentagonal structure similar to that of penta-graphene. The structure was first synthesized in 2005.

=== Si_{24} ===
Si_{24} is an orthorhombic crystalline Si allotrope. It was first synthesized in 2014. Creating the allotrope involved forming Na_{4}Si_{24}, a polycrystalline compound with help from a tantalum capsule, high temperature, and a 1,500 ton multi-anvil press that gradually reached a pressure of 10 gigapascals (1,500,000 psi). Next it was "degassed" in a vacuum at 400 K (127 °C; 260 °F) for eight days. The result was a zeolite-type structure.

Si_{24} has a quasi-direct band gap (specifically a small and almost flat indirect band gap). It can conduct electricity more efficiently than diamond-structured silicon. It can absorb and emit light. It is composed of five-, six-, and eight-membered rings. Small atoms and molecules could pass through the associated holes.

Si24 can be doped as both p- and n-type, and the dopants are readily ionized. Boron and phosphorus the most likely dopants.

Potential applications include energy storage and filtering.

=== 4H silicon ===
4H silicon is a bulk, highly ordered hexagonal 4-layer crystalline form of Si_{24}. Optical absorption measurements revealed an indirect band gap near 1.2 eV, in agreement with first principles calculations.

=== Silicyne ===
1-dimensional silicyne is analogous to the carbon allotrope carbyne, being a long chain of silicons, instead of carbons. 2-dimensional silicyne is analogous to the carbon allotrope graphyne.
