= Silicyne =

Allotrope of silicon

Silicynes are allotropes of silicon.

1-dimensional silicyne is analogous to the carbon allotrope carbyne, being a long chain of silicons, instead of carbons. It is amorphous silicon with sp hybridization of the valence electrons. Silicyne is a single linear molecule composed of just silicon atoms. One of the manners they are bonded to each other in a succession of double-bonded silicons, analogous to the situation of carbon found in cumulene. The other manner they may be bonded to each other is a succession of alternating single and triple-bonded silicons, analogous to the situation of carbon found in polyyne.

2-dimensional silicyne is analogous to the carbon allotrope graphyne, and similar to the silicon allotrope silicene, being a sheet of silicon atoms. In this form, the silicyne chains that link the silicene hexagons use disilyne bonding alternating with disilane bonding, analogous to polyyne.
