= -ene =

Suffix used in organic chemistry

The suffix -ene is used in organic chemistry to form names of organic compounds where the -C=C- group has been attributed the highest priority according to the rules of organic nomenclature. Sometimes a number between hyphens is inserted before it to say that the double bond is between that atom and the atom with the next number up. This suffix is taken from the end of the word ethylene, which is the simplest alkene. The final "-e" disappears if it is followed by a suffix that starts with a vowel, e.g. "-enal" which is a compound that contains both a -C=C- bond and an aldehyde functional group. If the other suffix starts with a consonant or "y", the final "-e" remains, e.g. "-enediyne" (which has the "-ene" suffix and also the "-yne" suffix, for a compound with a double bond and two triple bonds.)

A Greek number prefix before the "-ene" indicates how many double bonds there are in the compound, e.g. butadiene.

== Stereochemistry ==
Since alkenes containing two different groups on each side of the -C=C- double bond can exhibit geometric isomerism, alkenes often contain the prefixes "cis-" and "trans-", or more formally, "(E)-" and "(Z)-."

== Inorganic Chemistry ==
The suffix "-ene" is also used in inorganic chemistry to indicate a one-atom thick two-dimensional layer of atoms—known as a "Xene"—as in graphene, silicene, stanene, borophene, and germanene. Additionally, the suffix is used for MXenes due to their similarity to graphene.

== See also ==
- IUPAC nomenclature of organic chemistry
