= Mechanochemistry =

Study of chemical reactions influenced by mechanical phenomena

Mechanochemistry (or mechanical chemistry) is the initiation of chemical reactions by solid-state mechanical means. Mechanochemistry thus represents a fourth way to cause chemical reactions, complementing thermal reactions in fluids, photochemistry, and electrochemistry. Mechanochemistry focuses on the transformations of covalent bonds by mechanical force. Not covered by the topic are many phenomena: phase transitions, dynamics of biomolecules (docking, folding), and sonochemistry. Mechanochemistry also encompasses mechanophores which are molecules that undergo predictable changes in response to applied stress. Two types of mechanophores are mechanochromic ones in which a force causes a change in molecular structure and subsequently color and acid releasing mechanophores that release small amounts of an acid such as HCl in response to an applied force.

Mechanochemistry is not the same as mechanosynthesis, which refers specifically to the machine-controlled construction of complex molecular products.

In natural environments, mechanochemical reactions are frequently induced by physical processes such as earthquakes, glacier movement or hydraulic action of rivers or waves. In extreme environments such as subglacial lakes, hydrogen generated by mechnochemical reactions involving crushed silicate rocks and water can support methanogenic microbial communities. And mechanochemistry may have generated oxygen in the ancient Earth by water splitting on fractured mineral surfaces at high temperatures, potentially influencing life's origin or early evolution.

== History ==
One prehistoric human-activated mechanochemical reaction was making fire by rubbing pieces of wood against each other, creating friction and hence heat, triggering combustion at the elevated temperature. Another reaction involves the use of flint and steel, during which a spark (a small particle of pyrophoric metal) spontaneously combusts in air, starting fire instantaneously.

Industrial mechanochemistry began in ancient times with the grinding of two solid reactants. Mercuric sulfide (the mineral cinnabar) and copper metal thereby react to produce mercury and copper sulfide:

HgS + 2Cu → Hg + Cu_{2}S

A special issue of Chemical Society Review was dedicated to mechanochemistry in 2013.

Scientists recognized that mechanochemical reactions occur in environments naturally due to various processes, and the reaction products have the potential to influence microbial communities in tectonically active regions. The field has garnered increasing attention recently as mechanochemistry has the potential to generate diverse molecules capable of supporting extremophilic microbes, influencing the early evolution of life, developing the systems necessary for the origin of life, or supporting alien life forms. The field has now inspired the initiation of a special research topic in the journal Frontiers in Geochemistry.

== Mechanical processes ==
=== Natural ===
Earthquakes crush rocks across Earth's subsurface and on other tectonically active planets. Rivers also frequently abrade rocks, revealing fresh mineral surfaces and waves at a shore erode cliffs fracture rocks and abrade sediments.

Similarly to rivers and oceans, the mechanical power of glaciers is evidenced by their impact on landscapes. As glaciers move downslope, they abrade rocks, generating fractured mineral surfaces that can partake in mechanochemical reactions.

Mechanochemistry also plays important roles in biology and medicine, where mechanical forces influence molecular and cellular processes and cellular chemistry affects cell mechanics. For example, sickle cell anemia arises from a mutation in hemoglobin that causes polymerization under low-oxygen conditions, leading to mechanical deformation of red blood cells—a phenomenon first elucidated by Linus Pauling as a "molecular disease". More recently, studies of biomolecular condensates highlight a bidirectional interplay between mechanics and chemistry: mechanical forces can influence phase separation, while changes in condensate properties—such as crosslinking, viscosity, or temperature—can alter their mechanical behavior, impacting cellular function and biochemical reactions. Polymeric condensates are also emerging as a new frontier in materials science due to their mechanochemical features.

=== Artificial ===
Mechanochemical transformations are often complex and different from thermal or photochemical mechanisms. Ball milling and ResonantAcoustic Mixing (RAM) are widely used processes in which mechanical force is used to achieve chemical transformations. In laboratories, planetary ball mills are typically used to induce crushing to investigate natural processes.

Mechanochemistry eliminates the need for many solvents, offering the possibility of more environmentally friendly industrial processes. For example, the mechanochemical process has been used to synthesize pharmaceutically-attractive phenol hydrazones.

== Chemical reactions ==
Mechanochemical reactions encompass reactions between mechanically fractured solid materials and any other reactants present in the environment. However, natural mechanochemical reactions frequently involve the reaction of water with crushed rock, so called water-rock reactions. Mechanochemistry is typically initiated by the breakage of bonds between atoms within many different mineral types.

=== Silicates ===
Silicates are the most common minerals in the Earth's crust, and thus comprise the mineral type most commonly involved in natural mechanochemical reactions. Silicates are made up of silicon and oxygen atoms, typically arranged in silicon tetrahedra. Mechanical processes break the bonds between the silicon and oxygen atoms. If the bonds are broken by a homolytic cleavage, unpaired electrons are generated:

≡Si–O–Si≡ → ≡Si–O• + ≡Si•

≡Si–O–O–Si≡ → ≡Si–O• + ≡Si–O•

≡Si–O–O–Si≡ → ≡Si–O–O• + ≡Si•

==== Hydrogen generation ====
The reaction of water with silicon radicals can generate hydrogen radicals:

2≡Si• + 2H_{2}O → 2≡Si–O–H + 2H•

2H• → H_{2}

This mechanism can generate H_{2} to support methanogens in environments with few other energy sources. However, at higher temperatures (~>80 °C), hydrogen radicals react with siloxyl radicals, preventing the generation of H_{2} by this mechanism:

≡Si–O• + H• → ≡Si–O–H

~~2H• → H_{2}~~

==== Oxidant generation ====
When oxygen reacts with silicon or oxygen radicals at the surface of crushed rocks, it can chemically adsorb to the surface:

≡Si• + O_{2} → ≡Si–O–O•

≡Si–O• + O_{2} → ≡Si–O–O–O•

These oxygen radicals can then generate oxidants such as hydroxyl radicals and hydrogen peroxide:

≡Si–O–O• + H_{2}O → ≡Si–O–O–H + •OH

2•OH → H_{2}O_{2}

Additionally, oxidants may be generated in the absence of oxygen at high temperatures:

≡Si–O• + H_{2}O → ≡Si–O–H + •OH

2•OH → H_{2}O_{2}

H_{2}O_{2} breaks down naturally in environments to form water and Oxygen gas:

2H_{2}O_{2} → 2H_{2}O + O_{2}

== Industrial applications ==
Fundamentals and applications ranging from nano materials to technology have been reviewed. The approach has been used to synthesize metallic nanoparticles, catalysts, magnets, γ‐graphyne, metal iodates, nickel–vanadium carbide and molybdenum–vanadium carbide nanocomposite powders.

Ball milling has been used to separate hydrocarbon gases from crude oil. The process used 1-10% of the energy of conventional cryogenics. Differential absorption is affected by milling intensity, pressure and duration. The gases are recovered by heating, at a specific temperature for each gas type. The process has successfully processed alkyne, olefin and paraffin gases using boron nitride powder.

(Poly)lactic acid, a green material, can be upcycled into alkyl lactate esters by mechanochemistry, using alcohol as a reaction partner under resonant acoustic mixing.

=== Storage ===
Mechanochemistry has potential for energy-efficient solid-state storage of hydrogen, ammonia and other fuel gases. The resulting powder is safer than conventional methods of compression and liquefaction.

=== Stress sensing ===
Mechanophores can be used to sense stress in polymeric materials. By bonding a mechanophore into a polymer chain as the chain is stretched the force is transferred to the mechanophore causing it to undergo a predictable change. There are a couple of common mechanophores used for stress sensing such as spiropyran, yellow fluorescent protein, PER-AZO or PER-DBF dyes in CB[8] rings and rhodamine-spirolactam derivatives. Spiropyran for example readily interconverts with its merocyanine form under applied stress leading it to change from a clear or light blue polymer to a purple one. Spiropyran has currently been incorporated into polymethyl methacrylate (PMMA), polydimethylsiloxane (PDMS), and polycaprolactone. Future applications for spiropyran could include its incorporation into nitrile rubber products such as surgical gloves that would change color upon rupture signaling to their users that they must be replaced.

Mechanophores can also be designed so that they release small amounts of acid under stress. In 2016 the Moore group synthesized a gem-dichlorocyclopropane that released HCl through either a rearrangement or an aromatization elimination reaction. Later on in 2020, the gem-dichlorocyclopropane mechanophore was modified to make it less scissle and improve its chemical stability. These mechanophores have already been incorporated into silicone elastomers and have proven their ability to indicate fractures. However, to use these acid releasing mechanophores as visual indicators a color changing pH indicator must be incorporated either into the polymer or as a coating on top.

There are pros and cons to both methods of stress sensing discussed above. Spiropyran has the benefit that it does not require any additional indicator however, because of this its color is not tunable. Since surgical gloves are usually blue or purple a light purple indicator may be hard for a user to spot especially if it's localized to a very small puncture area. Another possible problem with spiropyran is that it is reversible. While for some applications this could be beneficial if one wants to use it as a passive indicator of ruptures it may return to its original color before any rupture is detected. Acid releasing mechanophores also come with their benefits and drawbacks. While their indicating color is tunable based on the indicator that is used, due to releasing acid into the environment they may not be safe for use in all applications.

=== Drug delivery ===
Mechanochemistry has recently gained interest in the development of drug delivery systems where mechanical forces trigger medicinal release. These systems use materials that undergo mechanochemical transformation, enabling spatial and temporal control over drug release. Such mechanochemical platforms are particularly promising for targeted therapies, minimally invasive treatment, and responsive implants.

One approach involves embedding mechanophores into polymer matrices. Under mechanical stimulation (e.g., stretching, compression, or ultrasound), these mechanophores break or rearrange to release embedded drugs from their network. For example, disulfide- or ester-containing mechanophores have been incorporated into hydrogels that rupture in response to ultrasound or localized strain, enabling on-demand release of antibiotics or anticancer agents.

Mechanochemically synthesized porous carriers like metal-organic frameworks (MOFs) and covalent organic frameworks (COFs) also play a role. These materials can be fabricated using solvent-free ball milling and later loaded with therapeutic agents, with mechanical activation to help regulate cellular functions.

These strategies are currently being investigated for use in responsive wound dressings, wearable drug patches, and localized chemotherapeutic delivery systems.

== See also ==
- Embryonic differentiation waves
- Mechanoluminescence
- Mechanotransduction
- Tribology
