= Goldene =

Idealized atomic models of bulk gold, its (111) surface, and two-dimensional goldene.

Goldene is a single-layer allotrope of gold. The thinnest commercial gold leaf is some 400 times thicker than goldene. It features 9% lattice contraction compared to bulk gold.

== History ==
Goldene was synthesized as a free-standing material in 2024 by a team at Linköping University in Sweden. They made a disputed claim about the goldene work reported in 2022 by a team at New York University Abu Dhabi contained multiple layers but that was not true.

== Synthesis ==
(A) Starting layered Ti₃SiC₂ MAX phase. (B) Deposition of a gold coating. (C) During annealing, gold diffuses into the structure while silicon diffuses out. (D) Formation of Ti₃AuC₂ after removal of the excess gold coating by chemical-mechanical polishing. (E) Selective etching of the Ti₃C₂ carbide blocks exposes the atomic gold layers at the edges. (F) Released single-atom-thick gold layer.

The team used a material containing silicene between layers of titanium carbide. Gold layered on top of this combination diffused into the structure and replaced the silicon. Etching away the titanium carbide released free-standing goldene sheets that were up to 100 nanometres wide. The etching was performed using Murakami's reagent, in a 100-year-old technique used to decorate ironwork by Japanese blacksmiths. Surfactant molecules formed a barrier between goldene and the surrounding liquid — to stop the sheets from adhering.

The team is exploring the potential for preparing goldene from other non-van der Waals Au-intercalated phases, including developing etching schemes.

== Graphene comparison ==
Forming 2D allotropes of metals such as gold has been difficult because metal atoms tend to cluster together and form nanoparticles instead of nanosheets.

== Properties ==
The material displayed Au 4f binding energy increase of 0.88 eV. The material is a semiconductor, with the valence band maximum 50 meV below the Fermi level.

== Applications ==
Potential applications includes sensing and catalysis.

== See also ==
- Single-layer materials
