= David J. Wales =

British chemist (born 1963)

David Wales FRS MAE FRSC
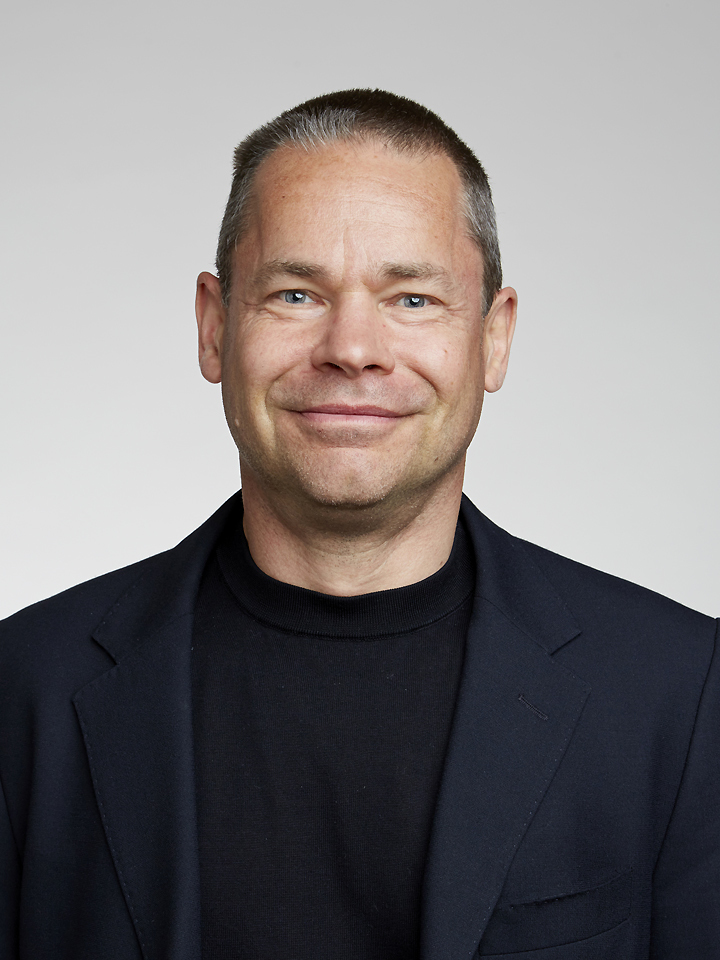
- Wales in 2016
- Born: 21 September 1963 (age 62)
- Education: University of Cambridge (BA, PhD, ScD)
- Known for: Stone–Wales defect
- Awards: Royal Society University Research Fellowship (1991-1998); Meldola Medal and Prize (1992); Tilden Prize (2015); ICReDD Award (2020)
- Scientific career
- Fields: Chemistry; Chemical physics; Chemical biology; Energy landscapes; Global Optimisation; Rare Event Dynamics; Cluster chemistry
- Workplaces: University of Cambridge; University of Chicago
- Thesis: Some theoretical aspects of cluster chemistry (1988)
- Doctoral advisor: Anthony J. Stone
- Other academic advisors: R. Stephen Berry
- Website: www-wales.ch.cam.ac.uk; www.ch.cam.ac.uk/group/wales/; www.dow.cam.ac.uk/people/professor-david-wales

David John Wales FRS FRSC (born 1963) is a professor of chemical physics in the Department of Chemistry at the University of Cambridge..

== Education ==
Wales was educated at Newport Free Grammar School followed by the University of Cambridge where he was awarded an open scholarship to study at Gonville and Caius College, Cambridge receiving his BA degree in 1985. He went on to complete a PhD on cluster chemistry, awarded in 1988 for research supervised by Anthony J. Stone. In 2004 he was awarded a ScD degree from Cambridge.

== Career and research ==
During 1989, Wales was an English-Speaking Union Lindemann Trust Fellow at the University of Chicago, doing postdoctoral research in collaboration with R. Stephen Berry. He returned to a research fellowship at Downing College, Cambridge in 1990, was a Lloyd's of London Tercentenary Fellow in 1991, and a Royal Society University Research Fellowship (URF) from 1991 to 1998. He was appointed a Lecturer in Cambridge in 1998, and Professor of Chemical Physics in 2008.

Wales' research investigates energy landscapes, with applications to chemical biology, spectroscopy, clusters, machine learning, quantum computing, solids and surfaces. Wales is the author of the textbook Energy Landscapes: Applications to Clusters, Biomolecules and Glasses and a co-author of Introduction to Cluster Chemistry with Michael Mingos.

His research has been funded by the European Research Council (Advanced Grant in 2010), the Engineering and Physical Sciences Research Council (EPSRC) and the Biotechnology and Biological Sciences Research Council (BBSRC).

=== Awards and honours ===
Wales was awarded the Cambridge University Norrish Prize for Chemistry and the Gonville and Caius College Schuldham Plate in 1985, the Meldola Medal and Prize in 1992 and the Tilden Prize in 2015, both by the Royal Society of Chemistry. He was a Baker Lecturer at Cornell University in 2005, the Inaugural Henry Frank Lecturer at the University of Pittsburgh in 2007, Distinguished Lecturer at the National Institute of Standards and Technology, USA in 2018, and was awarded a Visiting Miller Professorship at the University of California, Berkeley, for 2020. He was the first recipient of the ICReDD Award, commemorating Professor Akira Suzuki, at Hokkaido University in 2020. Wales was elected a Fellow of the Royal Society (FRS) in 2016 and is also a Fellow of the Royal Society of Chemistry. He received a Humboldt Research Prize from the Alexander von Humboldt Foundation in 2020. In 2026 he became a Member of Academia Europaea and was elected a Foreign Fellow of the Indian National Science Academy.

=== Academic appointments ===
2025 Shri Gopal Rajgarhia International Senior Visitor, IIT Kharagpur. 2024 Spotlight Talk, School of Natural and Biomedical Sciences, Warsaw. 2024 Distinguished Visiting Professor, New York University. 2023 Infosys Distinguished Visiting Professor, Harish-Chandra Research Institute, Allahabad. 2023 International Lecture Series, Zhejiang University, China. 2020-2025 International Chair, Institute for Artificial Intelligence, Cote d'Azur. 2017- Chair of the Theory Group, Department of Chemistry, Cambridge University. 2014 Telluride Science Research Centre 30th Anniversary Lecturer. 2013-2018 Institute for Molecular Science, Japan, International Advisory Board. 2012 Chair of Inaugural ESF Energy Landscapes Meeting. 2017 Visiting Professor, Universidad de La Laguna. 2011-2012 Visiting Professor, Université de Lyon. 2006 Visiting Professor, Boston University. 2006 Visiting Professor, Université Paul Sabatier, Toulouse. 1999 Visiting Professor, Université de Paris-Sud, Orsay. 1999 Visiting Professor, Harvard University.
