= Plumbene =

Material made up of a single layer of lead atoms

Plumbene is a material made up of a single layer of lead atoms. The material is created in a process similar to that of graphene, silicene, germanene, and stanene, in which high vacuum and high temperature are used to deposit a layer of lead atoms on a substrate. High-quality thin films of plumbene have revealed two-dimensional honeycomb structures.

== Preparation and structure ==
In April 2019, J. Yuhara and others reported the deposition of a single atom thickness by molecular beam epitaxy with a segregation method upon a palladium surface in a crystal lattice with Miller indices (111). The structure was confirmed with scanning tunneling microscopy (STM) revealing a nearly flat honeycomb structure. There is no evidence of any three-dimensional islands, but one notices a unique nanostructured tessellation all over the terraces looking like a space-filling polyhedral foam reduced to dimension 2.

== Properties ==
Plumbene's electronic and optical properties have been determined from ab initio calculations, indicating a band gap of 0.4 eV.
