= Penta-silicene =

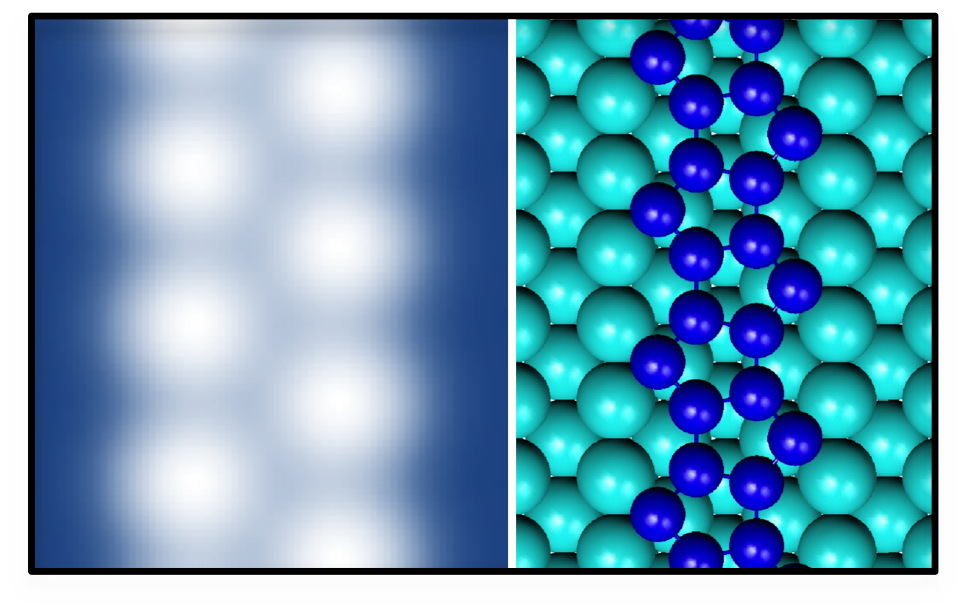
STM image (left) and structural model (right) of the 1D single strand nanoribbons with penta-silicene structure. 2,5x2,1nm2.

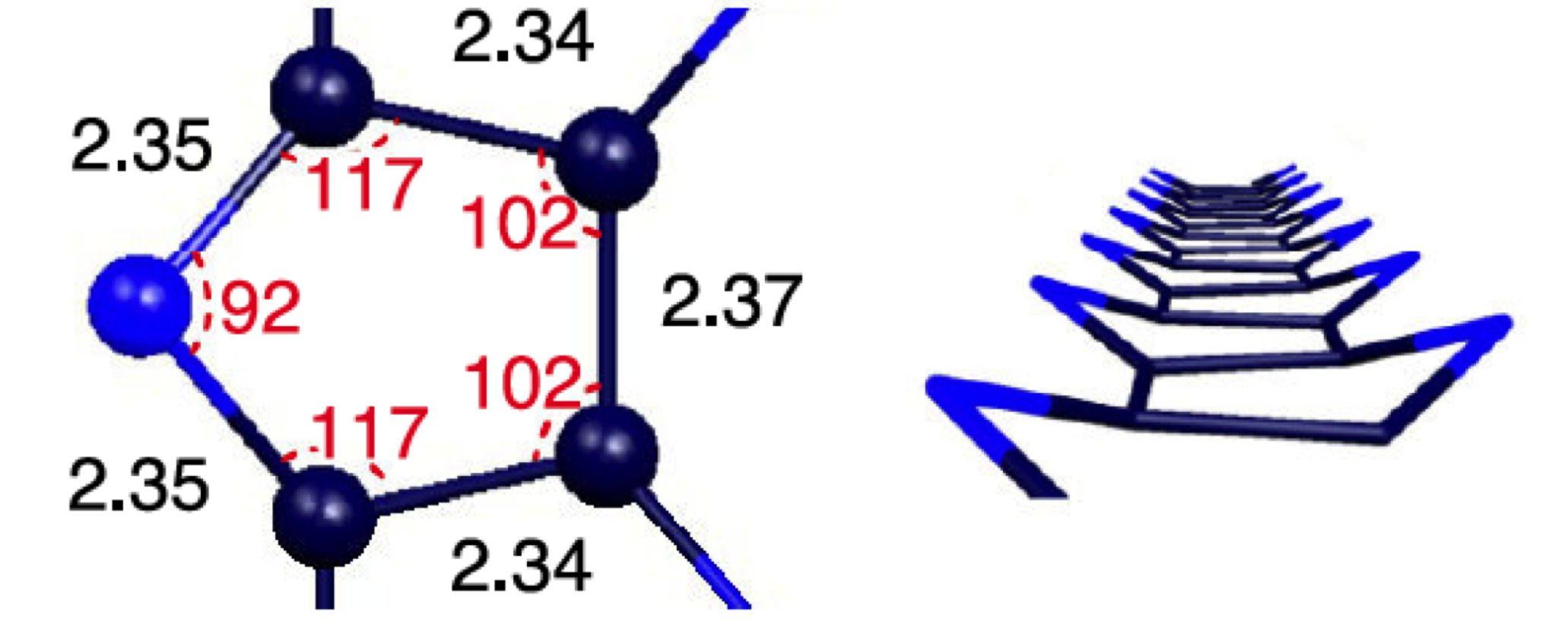
Fig. 2: Zoom in of the pentagonal rings including the Si-Si bond distances (in Å) and bond angles (in red), and perspective views of the 1D pentagonal structures

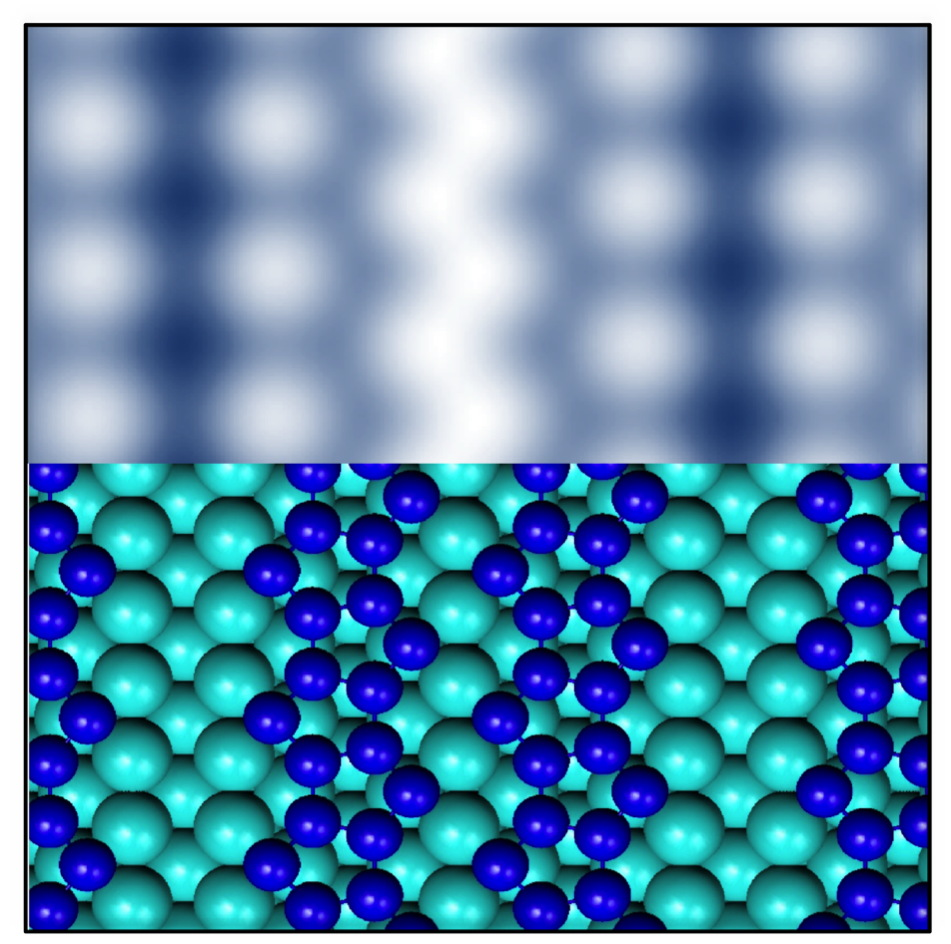
Fig 3: Upper part 3,8x1,8nm2 STM experimental double-strand NRs and lower part simulated structural model for a 5x2 grating of double-strand penta-silicene NRs.

Penta-silicene or pentasilicene denotes a silicon-based two-dimensional (2D) structure, a cousin of silicene, composed entirely of Si pentagons, in analogy with penta-graphene, a hypothetical variant of graphene. As of 2017 such a structure has only been obtained synthetically as one-dimensional nanoribbons (1D-NRs) grown on a silver (110) substrate. These nanoribbons adopt a highly ordered chiral arrangement in single- and/or double-strands (SNRs and DNRs, respectively). They were discovered in 2005 upon depositing Si onto the Ag(110) surface held at room temperature or at about 200 °C, and observed in scanning tunneling microscopy. However, their unique atomic structure was unveiled only in 2016 through thorough density functional theory calculations and simulations of the STM images. It consists of alternating Si pentagons residing along a missing row formed at the silver surface during the growth process (see Fig. 1). In the Penta-silicene NRs each Si pentagonal moiety displays an envelope conformation whereby four atoms are coplanar and a fifth flap atom protrudes out of the surface. The pentagons, nevertheless, do not deviate much from regular ones (see Fig. 2). DNRs consist of two SNRs with the same handedness running in parallel along two missing rows separated by two Ag lattice constants (aAg = 4.1 Å) (see Fig. 3).

These theoretical results were further corroborated later in a detailed surface X-ray diffraction study.

The uniqueness of penta-silicene NRs resides in the fact that pentagonal Si motifs are hardly found in nature. Despite large efforts devoted to design Si-based structures analogous to those of carbon, the existence of Si pentagonal rings had only been reported in clathrate bulk phases or in Si surface reconstructions, like, typically, for the cleaved Si(111)2x1 surface

The discovery of 1D-penta-silicene nanoribbons increases the chances of the future isolation of this new low dimensional Si allotrope, provided these epitaxial nanoribbons can be detached from the silver surface.

The possibilities offered by this one-dimensional pentagonal structure include enlarged spin–orbit effects and Si-based nano-wires.
