= Sally Price (chemist) =

British chemist

Sally Price FRS
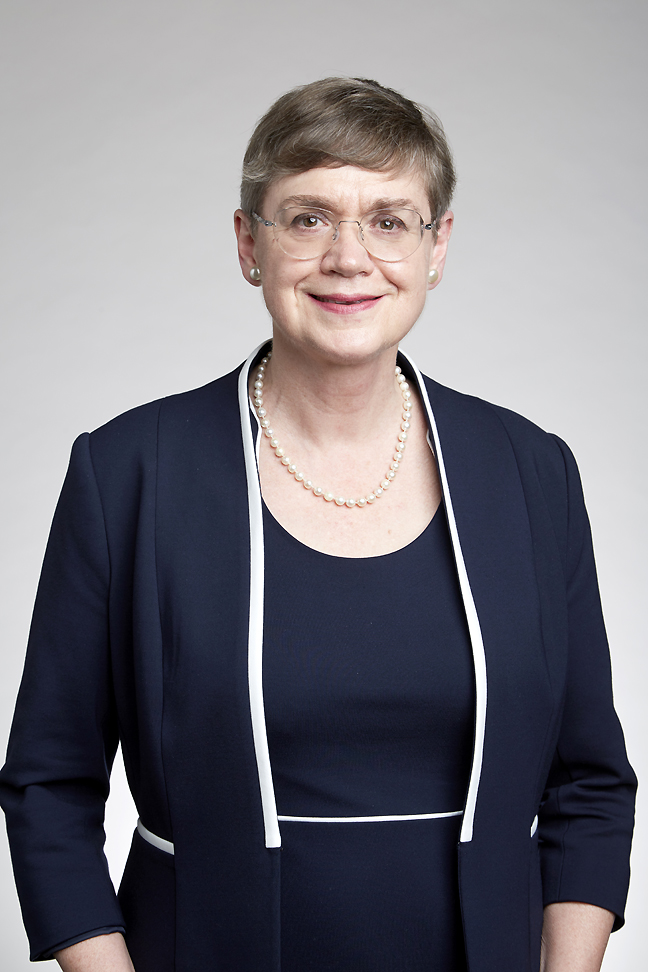
- Price in 2017
- Born: Sarah Lois Price; 1956 (age 69–70); Watford
- Education: University of Cambridge
- Awards: RSC Interdisciplinary Prize (2015)
- Scientific career
- Fields: Theoretical chemistry Computational chemistry
- Workplaces: University College London
- Thesis: Model intermolecular pair potentials (1980)
- Doctoral advisor: Anthony Stone
- Website: www.ucl.ac.uk/chemistry/people/sally-price

Sarah "Sally" Lois Price (born 1956) is a British chemist who is a Professor of Physical Chemistry at University College London.

== Education ==
Price was educated at the University of Cambridge, where she was awarded a Bachelor of Arts degree in 1977 followed by a PhD in 1980. Her doctoral research modelled the intermolecular forces between diatomic molecules and was supervised by Anthony Stone.

== Awards and memberships ==
Price was elected a Fellow of the Royal Society (FRS) in 2017 and was awarded the Interdisciplinary Prize by the Royal Society of Chemistry in 2015. Price is a member of the American Chemical Society and the British Crystallographic Association. In 2018 Price was elected as a Member of the Academica Europea.
