= Anthony Stone =

British theoretical chemist (born 1938)

- Born: Anthony John Stone; 4 November 1938 (age 87); Rugby, Warwickshire, England
- Citizenship: British
- Education: University of Cambridge
- Known for: Stone–Wales defect
- Scientific career
- Fields: Chemistry
- Workplaces: University of Cambridge
- Doctoral advisor: H. Christopher Longuet-Higgins
- Doctoral students: Sarah (Sally) Price; David J. Wales
- Website: www-stone.ch.cam.ac.uk; www.ch.cam.ac.uk/person/ajs1

Anthony J. Stone (born 4 November 1938) is a British theoretical chemist and emeritus professor in the Department of Chemistry at the University of Cambridge.

== Education ==
Stone studied Natural Sciences at Emmanuel College, Cambridge and obtained a Ph.D. in theoretical chemistry under H. Christopher Longuet-Higgins.

== Career and research ==
In 1964 he took up a position in the Department of Chemistry at the University of Cambridge, where he remained until his retirement in 2006. He is known for the Stone–Wales defect of fullerene isomers.
