= Stone–Wales defect =

Bond transition dependent defect in the structure of molecular materials

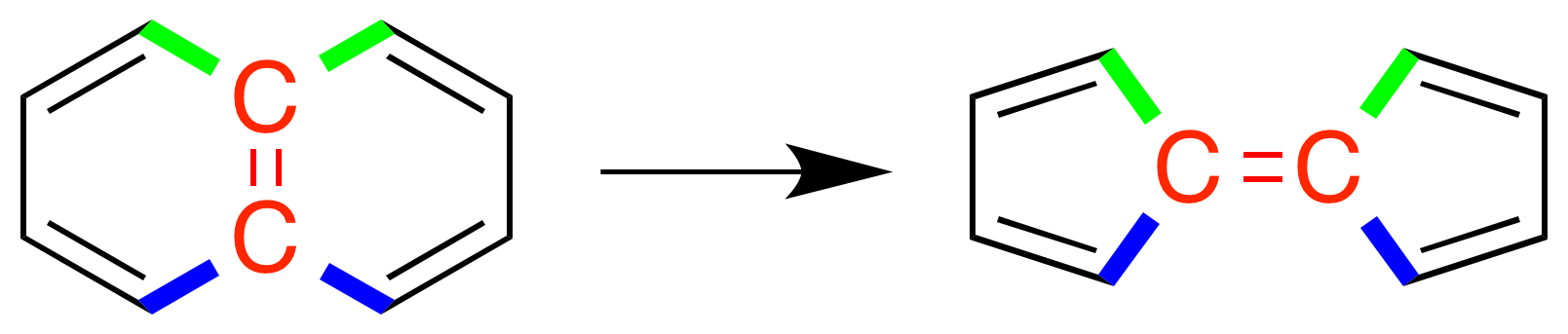
Skeletal structures for the conversion of naphthalene into fulvalene, highlighting the Stone–Wales defect rearrangement details.

A Stone–Wales defect is a crystallographic defect that involves the change of connectivity of two π-bonded carbon atoms, leading to their rotation by 90° with respect to the midpoint of their bond. The reaction commonly involves conversion between a naphthalene-like structure into a fulvalene-like structure, that is, two rings that share an edge vs two separate rings that have vertices bonded to each other.

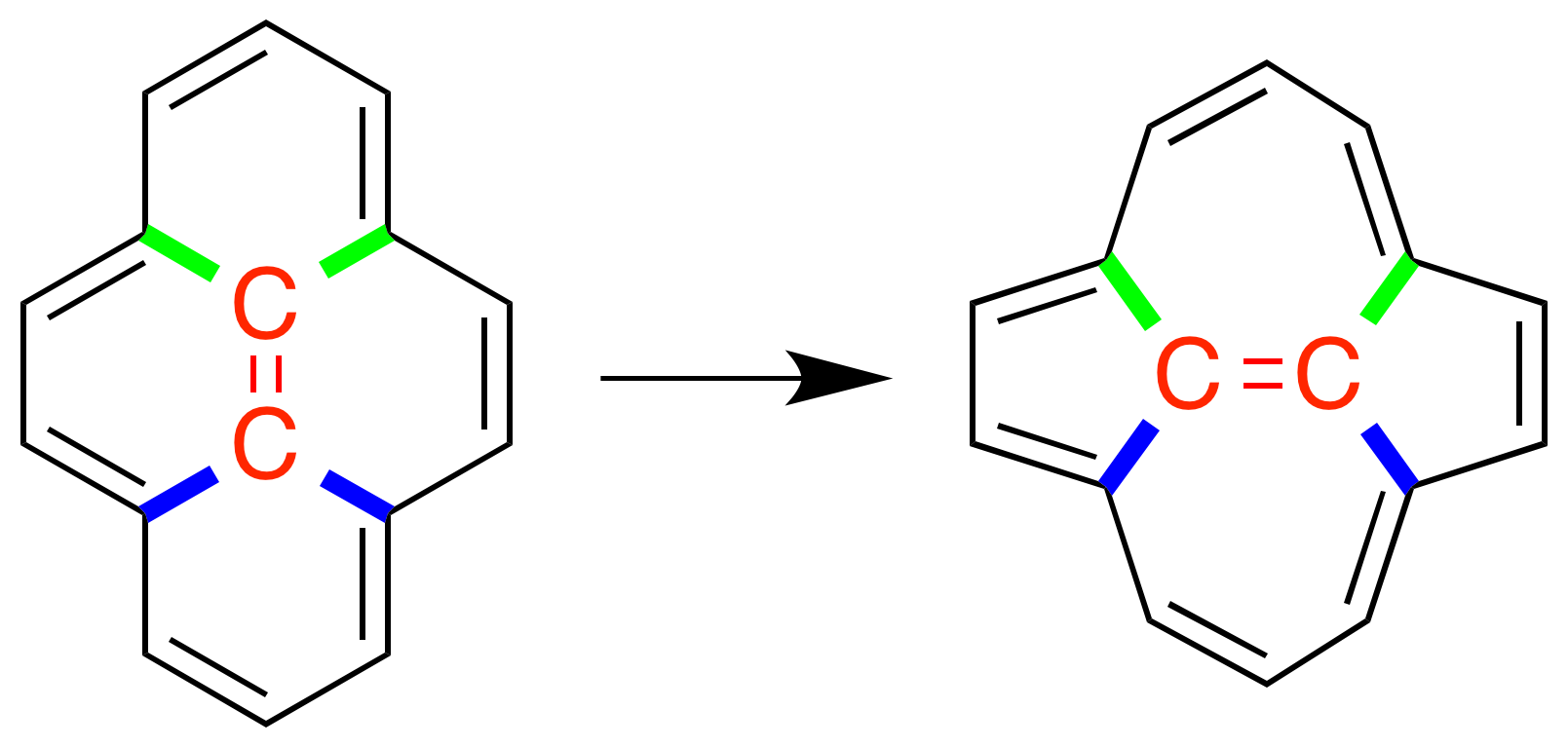
Skeletal structures for the conversion of pyrene by a Stone–Wales defect rearrangement.

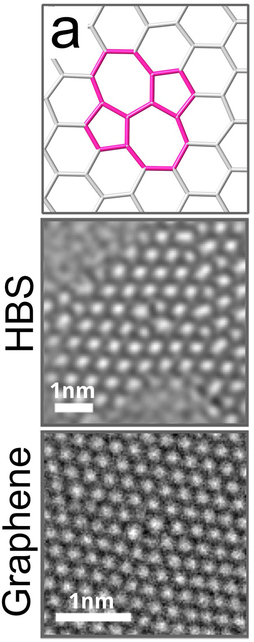
Stone–Wales defect in 2D silica (HBS, middle) and graphene (bottom): model and TEM images.

Stone-Wales defect in fullerene

The reaction occurs on carbon nanotubes, graphene, and similar carbon frameworks, where the four adjacent six-membered rings of a pyrene-like region are changed into two five-membered rings and two seven-membered rings when the bond uniting two of the adjacent rings rotates. In these materials, the rearrangement is thought to have important implications for the thermal, chemical, electrical, and mechanical properties. The rearrangement is an example of a pyracyclene rearrangement.

== History ==
The defect is named after Anthony Stone and David J. Wales at the University of Cambridge, who described it in a 1986 paper on the isomerization of fullerenes. However, a similar defect was described much earlier by G. J. Dienes in 1952 in a paper on diffusion mechanisms in graphite and later in 1969 in a paper on defects in graphite by Peter Thrower. For this reason, the term Stone–Thrower–Wales defect is sometimes used.

== Structural effects ==
The defects have been imaged using scanning tunneling microscopy and transmission electron microscopy and can be determined using various vibrational spectroscopy techniques.

It has been proposed that the coalescence process of fullerenes or carbon nanotubes may occur through a sequence of such a rearrangements. The defect is thought to be responsible for nanoscale plasticity and the brittle–ductile transitions in carbon nanotubes.

== Chemical details ==
The activation energy for the simple atomic motion that gives the bond-rotation apparent in a Stone–Wales defects is fairly high—a barrier of several electronvolts. but various processes can create the defects at substantially lower energies than might be expected.

The rearrangement creates a structure with less resonance stabilization among the sp^{2} atoms involved and higher strain energy in the local structure. As a result, the defect creates a region with greater chemical reactivity, including acting as a nucleophile and creating a preferred site for binding to hydrogen atoms. The high affinity of these defects for hydrogen, coupled with the large surface area of the bulk material, might make these defects an important aspect in the use of carbon nanomaterials for hydrogen storage. Incorporation of defects along a carbon-nanotube network can program a carbon-nanotube circuit to enhance the conductance along a specific path. In this scenario, the defects lead to a charge delocalization, which redirects an incoming electron down a given trajectory.
