= Niobium chloride =

Niobium chloride may refer to:

- Niobium(IV) chloride (niobium tetrachloride), NbCl_{4}
- Niobium(V) chloride (niobium pentachloride), NbCl_{5}
