= Germanene =

Bi-dimensional crystalline structure of germanium

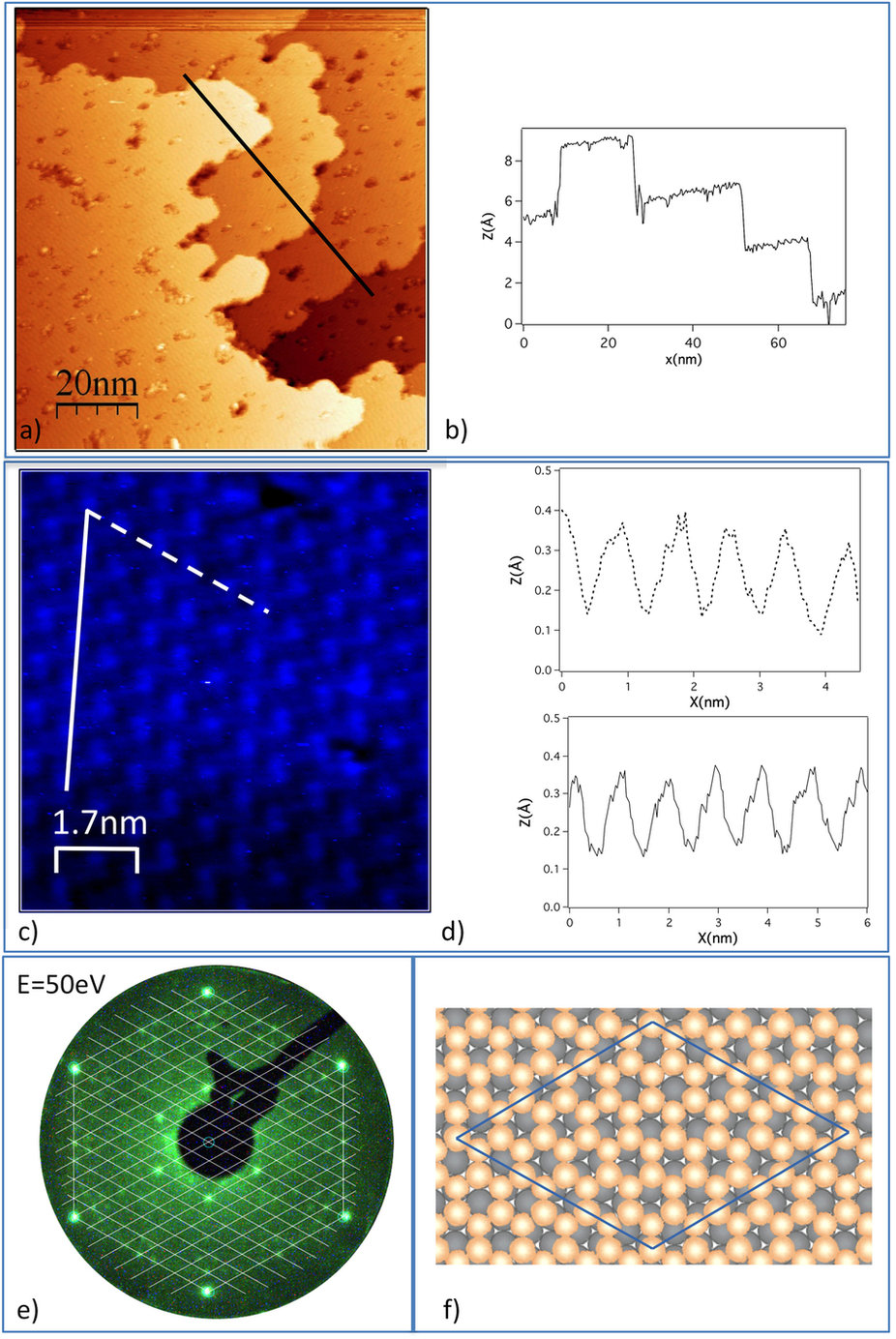
(a) STM image of germanene. (b) Profile (black line in (a)) showing step heights of ~3.2 Å. (c) High-resolution STM image (distorted by sample drift). (d) Profiles along the white continuous and dashed lines in (c) showing a ~9–10 Å separation between protrusions having heights of ~0.2 Å. (e) Electron diffraction pattern. (f) Model of germanene on Au(111).

Germanene is a material made up of a single layer of germanium atoms. The material is created in a process similar to that of silicene and graphene, in which high vacuum and high temperature are used to deposit a layer of germanium atoms on a substrate. High-quality thin films of germanene have revealed unusual two-dimensional structures with novel electronic properties suitable for semiconductor device applications and materials science research.

== Preparation and structure ==
In September 2014, G. Le Lay and others reported the deposition of a single atom thickness, ordered and two-dimensional multi-phase film by molecular beam epitaxy upon a gold surface in a crystal lattice with Miller indices (111). The structure was confirmed with scanning tunneling microscopy (STM) revealing a nearly flat honeycomb structure.

We have provided compelling evidence of the birth of nearly flat germanene—a novel, synthetic germanium allotrope which does not exist in nature. It is a new cousin of graphene.

— Guy Le Lay from Aix-Marseille University, New Journal of Physics

Additional confirmation was obtained by spectroscopic measurement and density functional theory calculations. The development of high quality and nearly flat single atom films created speculation that germanene may replace graphene if not merely add an alternative to the novel properties of related nanomaterials.

Bampoulis and others have reported the formation of germanene on the outermost layer of Ge_{2}Pt nanocrystals. Atomically resolved STM images of germanene on Ge_{2}Pt nanocrystals reveal a buckled honeycomb structure. This honeycomb lattice is composed of two hexagonal sublattices displaced by 0.2 Å in the vertical direction with respect to each other. The nearest-neighbor distance was found to be 2.5±0.1 Å, in close agreement with the Ge-Ge distance in germanene.

Based on STM observations and density functional theory calculations, formation of an apparently more distorted form of germanene has been reported on platinum. Epitaxial growth of germanene crystals on GaAs(0001) has also been demonstrated, and calculations suggest that the minimal interactions should allow germanene to be readily removed from this substrate.

Germanene's structure is described as "a group-IV graphene-like two-dimensional buckled nanosheet". Adsorption of additional germanium onto the graphene-like sheet leads to formation of "dumbbell" units, each with two out-of-plane atoms of germanium, one on either side of the plane. Dumbbells attract each other. Periodically repeating arrangements of dumbbell structures may lead to additional stable phases of germanene, with altered electronic and magnetic properties.

In October 2018, Junji Yuhara and others reported that germanene is easily prepared by a segregation method, using a bare Ag thin film on a Ge substrate and achieved in situ its epitaxial growth. The growth of germanene, akin to graphene and silicene, by a segregation method, is considered to be technically very important for the easy synthesis and transfer of this highly promising 2D electronic material.

== Properties ==
Germanene's electronic and optical properties have been determined from ab initio calculations, and structural and electronic properties from first principles. These properties make the material suitable for use in the channel of a high-performance field-effect transistor and have generated discussion regarding the use of elemental monolayers in other electronic devices. The electronic properties of germanene are unusual, and provide a rare opportunity to test the properties of Dirac fermions. Germanene has no band gap, but attaching a hydrogen atom to each germanium atom creates one. These unusual properties are generally shared by graphene, silicene, germanene, stanene, and plumbene.
