= Titanate nanosheet =

Titanium based nanomaterial

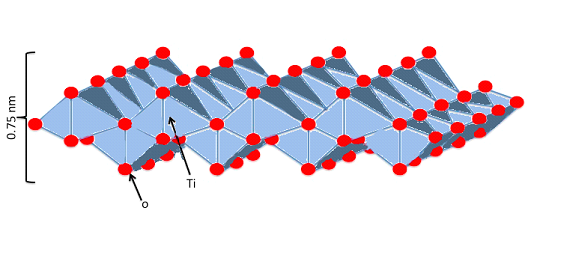
Structure of titanate nanosheets

Titanate (IV) nanosheets (TiNSs) have a 2D structure where TiO_{6} octahedra are edge-linked in a lepidocrocite-type 2D lattice with chemical formula H_{x}Ti_{2}—_{x/4}☐_{x/4}O_{4} ⦁ H_{2}O (x~0.7; ☐, vacancy). Titanate nanosheets may be regarded as sheets with molecular thickness and infinite planar dimensions. TiNSs are typically formed via liquid-phase exfoliation of protonic titanate. In inorganic layered materials, individual layers are bound to each other by van der Waals interactions if they are neutral, and additional Coulomb interactions if they are composed of oppositely charged layers. Through liquid-phase exfoliation, these individual sheets of layered materials can be efficiently separated using an appropriate solvent, creating single-layer colloidal suspensions. Solvents must have an interaction energy with the layers that is greater than the interaction energy between two layers. In situ X-Ray diffraction data indicates that TiNSs can be treated as macromolecules with a sufficient amount of solvent in between layers so that they behave as individual sheets.

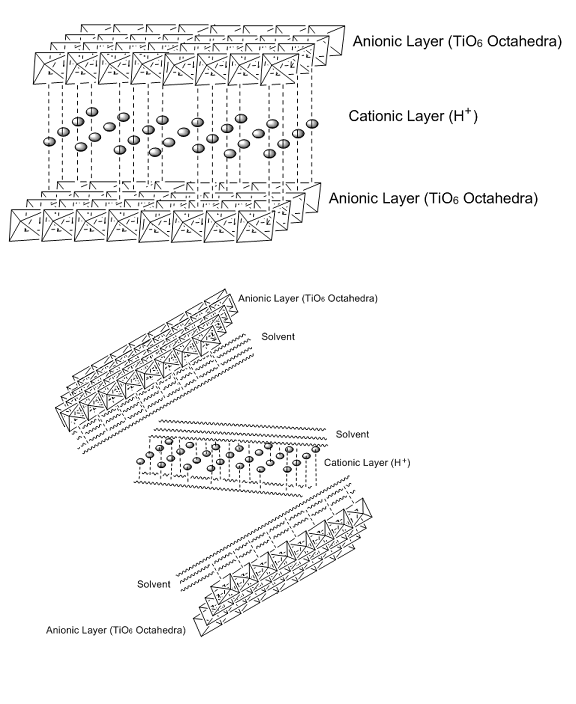
A starting inorganic material composed of alternating layers of charged material, in the case of protonated titanate the cationic layer is composed of protons while the anionic layer is composed of edge linked TiO6 octahedra. A solvent is chosen such that it has a greater interaction energy with the sheets than they do with each other, and this interaction will replace the bonds holding the sheets together yielding colloidal suspensions of 2D nanosheets.

== Properties ==
Unilamellar TiNSs have a number of unique properties, and are said to combine those of conventional titanate and titania. Structurally, they are infinite ultrathin (~0.75 nm) 2D sheets with a high density of negative surface charges originating from the oxygen atoms at the corners of the adjoint octahedrons . TiNSs may balance this anionic charge by inserting a counterionic layer between the two sheets either via layering or in aqueous solution. This electric double layer gives the material flexible interlayer distances, high cation exchange capacity, and excellent dielectric capabilities.

Typically, titanium oxide suffers from oxygen vacancies, which diminish its potential as capacitors due to vacancies acting as high-leakage paths and charge carrier traps, however, TiNSs possess Ti vacancies, which promote channels for electron transfer. When Ti vacancies are present, the effective charge felt by electrons on oxygen atoms reduces and allows less hindered electron motion.

== Applications ==
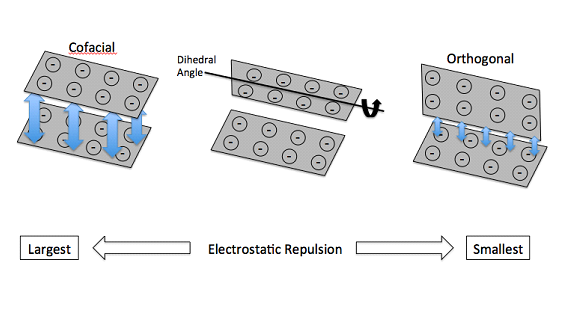
Cofacial Alignment of TiNSs. The cofacial alignment of the anionically charged titanate maximizes the repulsion between cofacial sheets and occurs under a magnetic field.

TiNSs can act as highly efficient adsorbents and photocatalysts due to their two-dimensional geometry and structure. This phenomenon can be exploited for several applications, including the removal of metal ions and dyes from water systems. Further, TiNSs potential as an electrocatalyst may enhance fuel cell efficiency during fuel oxidation. Similarly, intercalated myoglobin is proven to be an efficient catalyst for H_{2}O_{2}.

TiNSs may also be used for immobilizing biomolecules. When a monolayer of hemoglobin is intercalated into TiNSs, the electron transfer between the active sites of the protein and the electrodes is amplified, and electrocatalytic activity for O_{2} reduction increases. In addition, heterostructured nanosheets of Fe_{3}O_{4}-Na_{2}Ti_{3}O_{7} can be used for protein separation. When placed in the aqueous environment at pH 6, positively charged hemoglobin binds to the nanosheets, whereas negative albumin can be detected in the supernatant.

Perhaps the most interesting application of TiNSs is in the development of a material dominated by electrostatically repulsive interactions. TiNSs exhibit maximum electrostatic repulsion when they are aligned cofacially. To create the hydrogel based on this, a solution of TiNSs is placed in a strong magnetic field where repulsive forces induce a quasi-crystalline structure. Upon irradiation with UV-light, the solution polymerizes and creates cross-linked network, which is non-covalently attached to the TiNSs. This creates a composite that resists orthogonally applied compressive forces, but easily deforms due to shear forces. TiNSs solutions of this sort may be used as an anti-vibration or vibration-isolating material and in the design of artificial cartilage.

Titanate nanosheets can also be aligned within polymer, parallel to the surface of the substrate by simple drop casting. The intercalation of polymer and orientation of nanosheets were studied by small-angle X-ray scattering (SAXS) using in-plane and symmetrical scan. SAXS mapping indicated homogeneous alignment of titanate nanosheets within polymer. The mechanical reinforcement of polyamic acid using titanate nanosheets matched with Halpin-Tsai model, which is a composite model that assume the filler is in aligned position.
