= Stanene =

Topological insulating superconductor

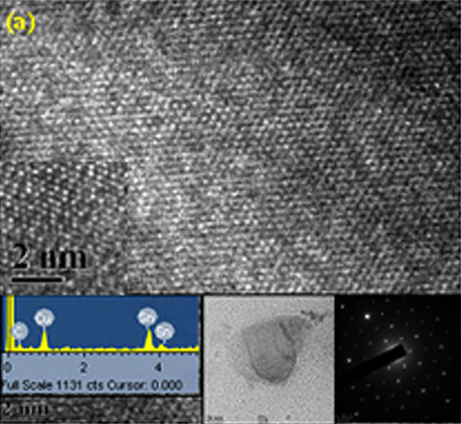
HRTEM image of sample showing hexagonal lattice. The inset on the bottom left shows the EDAX spectrum from the same spot. Carbon and copper peaks arises from the TEM grid used. The middle inset shows large area TEM of stanene flake with layers.

Stanene is a topological insulator, theoretically predicted by Shoucheng Zhang's group at Stanford, which may display dissipationless currents at its edges near room temperature. It is composed of tin atoms arranged in a single layer, in a manner similar to graphene. Stanene got its name by combining stannum (the Latin name for tin) with the suffix -ene used by graphene. Research is ongoing in Germany and China, as well as at laboratories at Stanford and UCLA.

The addition of fluorine atoms to the tin lattice could extend the critical temperature up to 100 °C. This would make it practical for use in integrated circuits to make smaller, faster and more energy efficient computers.

== See also ==
- Single-layer materials
- Graphene
- Silicene
- Boron

Stannenes (Similar name to Stanene)

- Stannane (similar name as Stanene, too)
- Semiconductors
- Topological insulator
- Superconductivity
- Superconductors
