= Graphyne =

Allotrope of carbon

- Chemical structure of graphyne-1

Identifiers
CAS Number	1300713-38-5
CompTox Dashboard (EPA)	DTXSID201336806
- Except where otherwise noted, data are given for materials in their standard state (at 25 °C [77 °F], 100 kPa). Infobox references

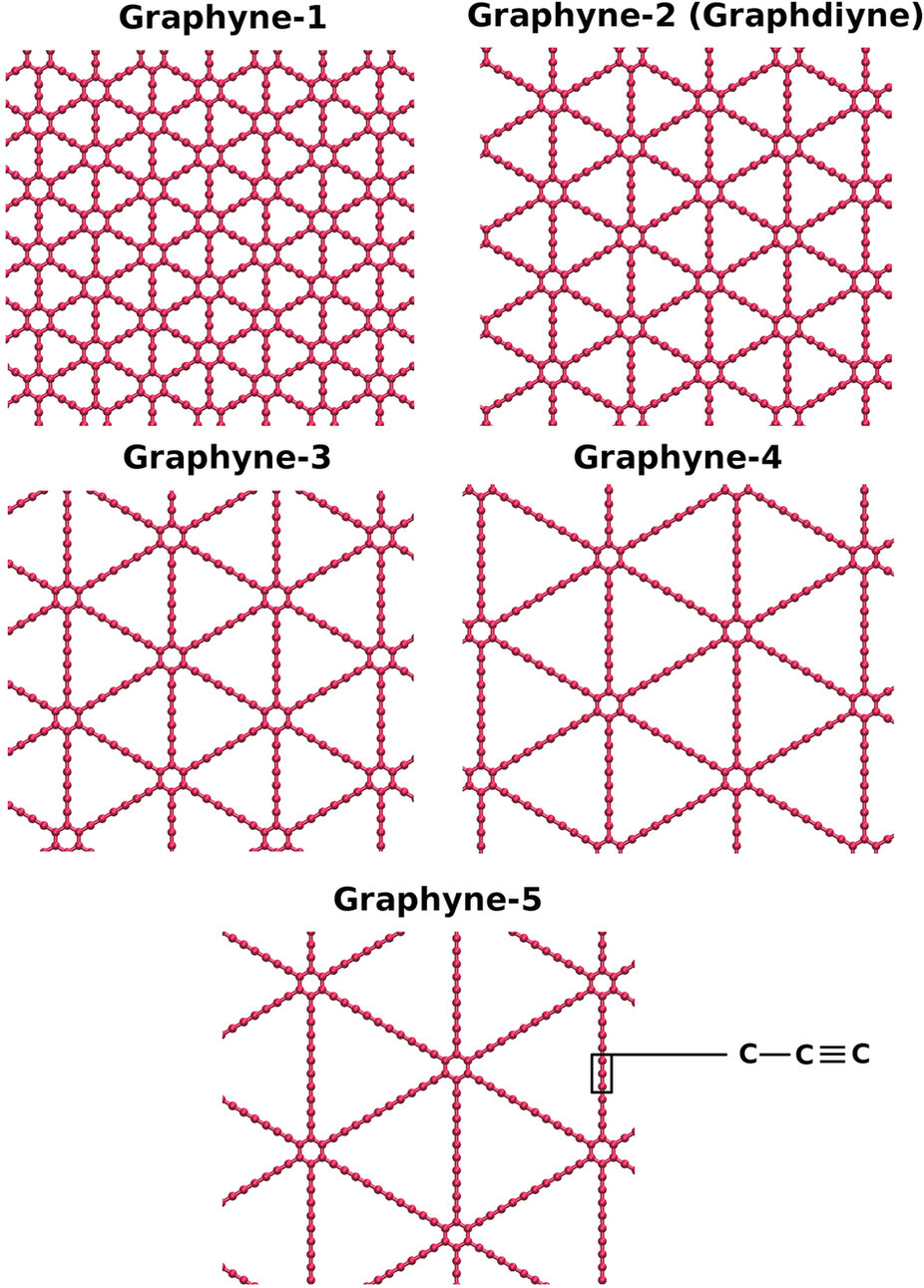
Graphyne-n varieties, where n indicates the number of carbon–carbon triple bonds in a link between two adjacent hexagons. Graphyne is graphyne-1; graphdiyne is graphyne-2.

Graphyne is an allotrope of carbon. Although it has been studied in theoretical models, it is very difficult to synthesize and only small amounts of uncertain purity have been created. Its structure is one-atom-thick planar sheets of sp and sp^{2}-bonded carbon atoms arranged in crystal lattice. It can be seen as a lattice of benzene rings connected by acetylene bonds. The material is called graphyne-n when benzene rings are connected by n sequential acetylene molecules, and graphdiyne for a particular case of n = 2 (diacetylene links).

Depending on the content of acetylene groups, graphyne can be considered a mixed hybridization, sp^{k}, where k can be 1 or 2, and thus differs from the hybridization of graphene (considered pure sp^{2}) and diamond (pure sp^{3}).

First-principles calculations showed that periodic graphyne structures and their boron nitride analogues are stable. The calculations used phonon dispersion curves and ab-initio finite temperature, quantum mechanical molecular dynamics simulations.

== History ==
Graphyne was first theoretically proposed by Baughman et al. in 1987. In 2010, Li et al. developed the first successful methodology for creating graphdiyne films using the Glaser–Hay cross-coupling reaction with hexaethynylbenzene. The proposed approach makes it possible to synthesize nanometer-scale graphdiyne and graphtetrayne, which lack long-range order. In 2019, Cui and co-workers reported on a mechanochemical technique for obtaining graphyne using benzene and calcium carbide. Although a gram-scale graphyne can be obtained using this approach, graphynes with long-range crystallinity over a large area remain elusive.

In 2022, synthesis of multi-layered γ‑graphyne was successfully performed through the polymerization of 1,3,5-tribromo-2,4,6-triethynylbenzene under Sonogashira coupling conditions. Near-infrared spectroscopy and cyclic voltammetry of the material determined the bandgap as 0.48 ± 0.05 eV, which agrees with the theoretical prediction for graphyne-based materials.

== Synthesis ==
Despite numerous efforts by different approaches, no synthesis method has been discovered to create quality graphyne. The small impure amounts created to date do not allow characterization sufficient to verify theoretical properties.

== Structure ==
Through the use of computer models scientists have predicted several properties of the substance on assumed geometries of the lattice. Its proposed structures are derived from inserting acetylene bonds in place of carbon-carbon single bonds in a graphene lattice. Graphyne is theorized to exist in multiple geometries. This variety is due to the multiple arrangements of sp and sp^{2} hybridized carbon. The proposed geometries include a hexagonal lattice structure and a rectangular lattice structure. Out of the theorized structures the rectangular lattice of 6,6,12-graphyne may hold the most potential for future applications.

== Properties ==
Models predict that graphyne has the potential for Dirac cones on its double and triple bonded carbon atoms. Due to the Dirac cones, the conduction and valence bands meet in a linear fashion at a single point in the Fermi level. The advantage of this scheme is that electrons behave as if they have no mass, resulting in energies that are proportional to the momentum of the electrons. Like in graphene, hexagonal graphyne has electric properties that are direction independent. However, due to the symmetry of the proposed rectangular 6,6,12-graphyne the electric properties would change along different directions in the plane of the material. This unique feature of its symmetry allows graphyne to self-dope meaning that it has two different Dirac cones lying slightly above and below the Fermi level. The self-doping effect of 6,6,12-graphyne can be effectively tuned by applying in-plane external strain. Graphyne samples synthesized to date have shown a melting point of 250-300 °C, low reactivity in decomposition reactions with oxygen, heat and light.

== Potential applications ==
It has been hypothesized that graphyne is preferable to graphene for specific applications owing to its particular energy structure, namely direction-dependent Dirac cones. The directional dependency of 6,6,12-graphyne could allow for electrical grating on the nanoscale. This could lead to the development of faster transistors and nanoscale electronic devices. Recently it was demonstrated that photoinduced electron transfer from electron-donating partners to γ-graphyne is favorable and occurs on nano to sub-picosecond time scale.
