= Silicene =

Two-dimensional allotrope of silicon

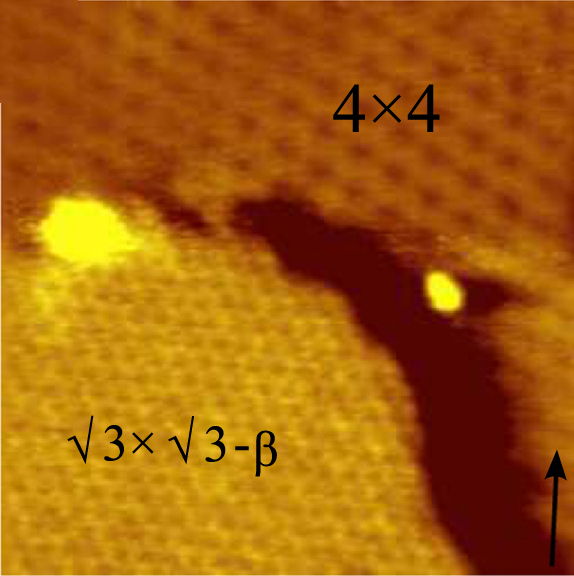
STM image of the first (4×4) and second layers (√3×√3-β) of silicene grown on a thin silver film. Image size 16×16 nm.

Silicene is a two-dimensional allotrope of silicon, with a hexagonal honeycomb structure similar to that of graphene. Contrary to graphene, silicene is not flat, but has a periodically buckled topology; the coupling between layers in silicene is much stronger than in multilayered graphene; and the oxidized form of silicene, 2D silica, has a very different chemical structure from graphene oxide.

== History ==
Although theorists had speculated about the existence and possible properties of free-standing silicene, researchers first observed silicon structures that were suggestive of silicene in 2010. Using a scanning tunneling microscope they studied self-assembled silicene nanoribbons and silicene sheets deposited onto a silver crystal, Ag(110) and Ag(111), with atomic resolution. The images revealed hexagons in a honeycomb structure similar to that of graphene, which, however, were shown to originate from the silver surface mimicking the hexagons. Density functional theory (DFT) calculations showed that silicon atoms tend to form such honeycomb structures on silver, and adopt a slight curvature that makes the graphene-like configuration more likely. However, such a model has been invalidated for Si/Ag(110): the Ag surface displays a missing-row reconstruction upon Si adsorption and the honeycomb structures observed are tip artifacts.

This was followed in 2013 by the discovery of dumbbell reconstruction in silicene that explains the formation mechanisms of layered silicene and silicene on Ag.

In 2015, a silicene field-effect transistor was tested. that opens up opportunities for two-dimensional silicon for fundamental science studies and electronic applications.

In 2022, it was found that silicene/Ag(111) growth on top of a Si/Ag(111) surface alloy, functions as a foundation and scaffold for the two-dimensional layer. This, however, raises questions of whether silicene can be truly regarded as two-dimensional material at all, due to its strong chemical bonds to the surface alloy.

== Similarities and differences with graphene ==
Silicon and carbon are similar atoms. They lie above and below each other in the same group on the periodic table, and both have an s^{2}p^{2} electronic structure. The 2D structures of silicene and graphene also are quite similar, but they have important differences. While both form hexagonal structures, graphene is completely flat, while silicene forms a buckled hexagonal shape. Its buckled structure gives silicene a tuneable band gap by applying an external electric field. Silicene's hydrogenation reaction is more exothermic than graphene's. Another difference is that since silicon's covalent bonds do not have pi-stacking, silicene does not cluster into a graphite-like form. The formation of a buckled structure in silicene unlike planar structure of graphene has been attributed to strong Pseudo Jahn–Teller distortions arising due to vibronic coupling between closely spaced filled and empty electronic states.

Silicene and graphene have similar electronic structures. Both have a Dirac cone and linear electronic dispersion around the Dirac points. Both also have a quantum spin Hall effect. Both are expected to have the characteristics of massless Dirac fermions that carry charge, but this is only predicted for silicene and has not been observed, likely because it is expected to only occur with free-standing silicene which has not been synthesized. It is believed that the substrate on which the silicene is made has a substantial effect on its electronic properties.

Unlike carbon atoms in graphene, silicon atoms tend to adopt sp^{3} hybridization over sp^{2} in silicene, which makes it highly chemically active on the surface and allows its electronic states to be easily tuned by chemical functionalization.

Compared with graphene, silicene has several prominent advantages: (1) a much stronger spin–orbit coupling, which may lead to a realization of quantum spin Hall effect in the experimentally accessible temperature, (2) a better tunability of the band gap, which is necessary for an effective field effect transistor (FET) operating at room temperature, (3) an easier valley polarization and more suitability for valleytronics study.

Unlike graphene, it has been shown that, at least silicene supported by Ag(111) grows on a surface alloy. Hence, decoupling silicene is much less trivial, if possible at all, than decoupling graphene.

== Surface alloying ==
Silicene on Ag(111) grows on top of a Si/Ag(111) surface alloy, which has been shown by a combination of different measurement techniques. The surface alloy precedes the growth of silicene, acting both as foundation and as scaffold for the two-dimensional layer. Upon further increase of silicon coverage, the alloy is covered by silicene, yet pervasively exists for all coverages. This implies that the properties of the layer are strongly influenced by its alloy.

== Band gap ==
Early studies of silicene showed that different dopants within the silicene structure provide the ability to tune its band gap. Very recently, the band gap in epitaxial silicene has been tuned by oxygen adatoms from zero-gap-type to semiconductor-type. With a tunable band gap, specific electronic components could be made-to-order for applications that require specific band gaps. The band gap can be brought down to 0.1 eV, which is considerably smaller than the band gap (0.4 eV) found in traditional field effect transistors (FETs).

Inducing n-type doping within silicene requires an alkali metal dopant. Varying the amount adjusts the band gap. Maximum doping increases the band gap 0.5 eV. Due to heavy doping, the supply voltage must also be about 30 V. Alkali metal-doped silicene can only produce n-type semiconductors; modern day electronics require a complementary n-type and p-type junction. Neutral doping (i-type) is required to produce devices such as light-emitting diodes (LEDs). LEDs use a p-i-n junction to produce light. A separate dopant must be introduced to generate p-type doped silicene. Iridium (Ir) doped silicene allows p-type silicene to be created. Through platinum (Pt) doping, i-type silicene is possible. With the combination of n-type, p-type and i-type doped structures, silicene has opportunities for use in electronics.

Power dissipation within traditional metal oxide semiconductor field effect transistors (MOSFETs) generates a bottleneck when dealing with nano-electronics. Tunnel field-effect transistors (TFETs) may become an alternative to traditional MOSFETs because they can have a smaller subthreshold slope and supply voltage, which reduce power dissipation. Computational studies showed that silicene based TFETs outperform traditional silicon based MOSFETs. Silicene TFETs have an on-state current over 1mA/μm, a sub-threshold slope of 77 mV/decade and a supply voltage of 1.7 V. With this much increased on-state current and reduced supply voltage, power dissipation within these devices is far below that of traditional MOSFETs and its peer TFETs.

Close up of one hexagonal ring in silicene with displayed buckled structure.

== Properties ==
2D silicene is not fully planar, apparently featuring chair-like puckering distortions in the rings. This leads to ordered surface ripples. Hydrogenation of silicenes to silicanes is exothermic. This led to the prediction that the process of conversion of silicene to silicane (hydrogenated silicene) is a candidate for hydrogen storage. Unlike graphite, which consists of weakly held stacks of graphene layers through dispersion forces, interlayer coupling in silicenes is very strong.

The buckling of the hexagonal structure of silicene is caused by pseudo Jahn–Teller distortion (PJT). This is caused by strong vibronic coupling of unoccupied molecular orbitals (UMO) and occupied molecular orbitals (OMO). These orbitals are close enough in energy to cause the distortion to high symmetry configurations of silicene. The buckled structure can be flattened by suppressing the PJT distortion by increasing the energy gap between the UMO and OMO. This can be done by adding a lithium ion.

In addition to its potential compatibility with existing semiconductor techniques, silicene has the advantage that its edges do not exhibit oxygen reactivity.

In 2012, several groups independently reported ordered phases on the Ag(111) surface. Results from scanning tunneling spectroscopy measurements and from angle-resolved photoemission spectroscopy (ARPES) appeared to show that silicene would have similar electronic properties as graphene, namely an electronic dispersion resembling that of relativistic Dirac fermions at the K points of the Brillouin zone, but the interpretation was later disputed and shown to arise due to a substrate band. A band unfolding technique was used to interpret the ARPES results, revealing the substrate origin of the observed linear dispersion.

Besides silver, silicene has been reported to grow on ZrB_{2}, and iridium. Theoretical studies predicted that silicene is stable on the Al(111) surface as a honeycomb-structured monolayer (with a binding energy similar to that observed on the 4x4 Ag(111) surface) as well as a new form dubbed "polygonal silicene", its structure consisting of 3-, 4-, 5- and 6-sided polygons.

The p-d hybridisation mechanism between Ag and Si is important to stabilise the nearly flat silicon clusters and the effectiveness of Ag substrate for silicene growth explained by DFT calculations and molecular dynamics simulations. The unique hybridized electronic structures of epitaxial 4 × 4 silicene on Ag(111) determines highly chemical reactivity of silicene surface, which are revealed by scanning tunneling microscopy and angle-resolved photoemission spectroscopy. The hybridization between Si and Ag results in a metallic surface state, which can gradually decay due to oxygen adsorption. X-ray photoemission spectroscopy confirms the decoupling of Si-Ag bonds after oxygen treatment as well as the relative oxygen resistance of Ag(111) surface, in contrast to 4 × 4 silicene [with respect to Ag(111)].

=== Functionalized silicene ===
Beyond the pure silicene structure, research into functionalized silicene has yielded successful growth of organomodified silicene – oxygen-free silicene sheets functionalized with phenyl rings. Such functionalization allows uniform dispersion of the structure in organic solvents and indicates the potential for a range of new functionalized silicon systems and organosilicon nanosheets.

== Silicene transistors ==
The U.S. Army Research Laboratory has been supporting research on silicene since 2014. The stated goals for research efforts were to analyze atomic scale materials, such as silicene, for properties and functionalities beyond existing materials, like graphene. In 2015, Deji Akinwande, led researchers at the University of Texas, Austin in conjunction with Alessandro Molle's group at CNR, Italy, and collaboration with U.S. Army Research Laboratory and developed a method to stabilize silicene in air and reported a functional silicene field effect transistor device. An operational transistor's material must have bandgaps, and functions more effectively if it possesses a high mobility of electrons. A bandgap is an area between the valence and conduction bands in a material where no electrons exist. Although graphene has a high mobility of electrons, the process of forming a bandgap in the material reduces many of its other electric potentials.

Therefore, there have been investigations into using graphene analogues, such as silicene, as field effect transistors. Despite silicene's natural state also having a zero-band gap, Akinwande and Molle and coworkers in collaboration with U.S. Army Research Laboratory have developed a silicene transistor. They designed a process termed "silicene encapsulated delamination with native electrodes" (SEDNE) to overcome silicene's instability in the air. The stability that resulted has been claimed to be due to Si-Ag's p-d hybridization. They grew a layer of silicene on top of a layer of Ag via epitaxy and covered the two with alumina (Al_{2}O_{3}). The silicene, Ag, and Al_{2}O_{3} were stored in a vacuum at room temperature and observed over a tracked period of two months. The sample underwent Raman spectroscopy to be inspected for signs of degradation, but none were found. This complex stack was then laid on top of a SiO_{2} substrate with the Ag facing up. Ag was removed in a thin strip down the middle to reveal a silicene channel. The silicene channel on the substrate had a life of two minutes when exposed to air until it lost its signature Raman spectra. A bandgap of approximately 210 meV was reported. The substrate's effects on silicene, in developing the bandgap, have been explained by the scattering of grain boundaries and limited transport of acoustic phonons, as well as by symmetry breaking and hybridization effect between silicene and the substrate. Acoustic phonons describe the synchronous movement of two or more types of atoms from their equilibrium position in a lattice structure.

== Silicene nanosheets ==
2D silicene nanosheets are used in high-voltage symmetric supercapacitors as attractive electrode materials.

== See also ==
- 2D silica
- Borophene
- Germanene
- Plumbene
- Stanene
