= Boron pnictide =

Boron pnictide can refer to any of the following materials:

Normal boron pnictides:

- Boron nitride, BN
- Boron phosphide, BP
- Boron arsenide, BAs

Boron subpnictides:

- Boron subphosphide, B_{12}P_{2}
- Boron subarsenide, B_{12}As_{2}
