= Yoke Khin Yap =

American researcher

- Born: 1968 (age 57–58)
- Occupations: Physicist, materials scientist and academic

Academic background
- Education: BS., Physics; MS., Physics; PhD., Electrical Engineering
- Alma mater: University of Malaya; Osaka University

Academic work
- Institutions: Michigan Technological University

Yoke Khin Yap (simplified Chinese: 叶玉牵; traditional Chinese: 葉玉牽; pinyin: Yè yù qiān; born 1968) is an American physicist, materials scientist, and academic. He is most known for his nanoscale and quantum-scale materials research, and serves as a professor of Physics at Michigan Technological University (MTU).

Yap has published research articles and a book entitled B-C-N Nanotubes and Related Nanostructures. He received the US National Science Foundation (NSF) Career Award in 2005, the MTU Bhakta Rath Award in 2011, the MTU research award in 2018, and was granted the title of Professor in 2020. Additionally, he is among the first few recipients named Osaka University Global Alumni Fellow in 2015.

== Education ==
Yap earned a bachelor's degree in physics in 1992 and a master's degree in 1994, both from the University of Malaya. In 1995, he received the Japanese Government's Monbusho Scholarship and completed a PhD in Electrical Engineering from Osaka University in 1999.

== Career ==
After earning his Ph.D., Yap continued his postdoctoral training at Osaka University from 1999 to 2002, serving as a Research Fellow. He joined Michigan Technological University as an assistant professor in 2002, later becoming associate professor in 2006, Professor in 2011 and has held the position of University Professor since 2020.

Yap was appointed one of the US representatives at the 2006 US-China Nanotechnology Workshop held at NSF. From 2005 to 2007, he was the Charter Member of the Users' Executive Committee (UEC) of the US Department of Energy's Center for Nanophase Materials Sciences at Oak Ridge National Laboratory to create the users association, becoming the first elected chair of the user group in 2008.

Yap held the position of Faculty Fellow in the MTU Office of the Vice President for Research from 2014 to 2016, and served as the Associate Department Chair of Physics in 2023.

== Research ==
Yap pioneered research on all-solid-state UV lasers based on cesium lithium borate (CsLiB_{6}O_{10}) nonlinear optical crystals. He initiated studies on boron-carbon nitride (B-C-N) materials and high-purity boron nitride nanotubes (BNNTs) using the all-solid-state UV laser. He developed novel chemical vapor deposition (CVD) methods for B-C-N related nanostructures. Later, his focus shifted to the unique applications of high-purity BNNTs for future electronics and biomedical applications.

=== Functionalized high-purity BNNTs for future electronics and biomedicine ===
Yap and his collaborators have conducted studies on the unique properties of electrically insulating and optically transparent boron nitride nanotubes (BNNTs), with a band gap of approximately 6 eV. Utilizing high-purity BNNTs' electrical insulating properties, he and his colleagues developed a method to prevent dye molecule quenching on BNNTs, resulting in each BNNT serving as a fluorophore with enhanced brightness by up to 1000 times, enabling the conversion of existing dye molecules into high-brightness fluorophores (HBFs) suitable for antigen detection, leveraging BNNTs' transparency across UV to near-IR wavelengths.

In joint research, Yap led the creation of high-performance field-effect transistors (FETs) by filling tellurium (Te) arrays of atoms inside electrically insulating BNNT. This contrasts the unstable semiconducting properties of single-walled carbon nanotubes (SW-CNTs) and graphene nanoribbons (GNRs) to structural changes and ambient conditions. He also demonstrated the creation of novel nanoscale semiconductors through a bottom-up approach, utilizing gold quantum dots coated on the surfaces of BNNTs, providing tunable band gaps capable of absorbing visible light. Additionally, he introduced a transistor fabrication method devoid of semiconductors, using quantum tunneling between gold quantum dots coated on BNNTs (QD-BNNTs) as the switching mechanism for single-electron transistors (SETs), offering improved current switching capabilities, particularly at shorter transport lengths, thus bypassing inherent limitations of traditional semiconductor-based transistors.

=== High-purity BNNTs ===
Yap's work on high-purity BNNTs centers on exploring different synthesis methods for various applications. He pioneered the synthesis of high-purity BNNTs by pulsed-laser deposition (PLD) and chemical vapor deposition (CVD). His group at MTU demonstrated the growth of BNNTs at 600^{o}C by using an all-solid-state UV laser, and also invented a low-temperature CVD method that enables the growth of BNNTs at 1100-1200^{o}C, similar to the synthesis of carbon nanotubes using regular furnaces in research laboratories.

=== B-C-N materials ===
Yap has investigated B-C-N materials through novel techniques. By using an all-solid-state UV laser, he created a radio-frequency (RF) plasma-assisted PLD system. He has demonstrated a series of original discoveries on carbon nitride (CN_{x}), cubic phase boron nitride (BN) and boron carbon nitride (B_{x}C_{y}N_{z}) materials, including the conversion of CN_{x} bonds from sp^{2} to sp^{3} hybridization and the synthesis of B_{x}C_{y}N_{z} nanostructures.

=== High-power all-solid-state UV laser for PLD by CsLiB_{6}O_{10} crystals ===
Yap examined ultraviolet (UV) lasers, essential for photolithography, materials processing, and pulsed laser deposition (PLD), noting that commercial excimer lasers are bulky and use corrosive gasses and high voltage. He pioneered the research on the fourth and fifth harmonic generation (4ɯ and 5ɯ) of Nd:YAG lasers using the cesium lithium borate (CsLiB_{6}O_{10}) crystals invented by his research advisors (Takatomo Sasaki and Yusuke Mori), resulting in compact all-solid-state UV lasers that delivered pulsed energy as high as 500mJ (266 nm, 4ɯ) and 230mJ (213 nm, 5w).

== Entrepreneurship ==
Yap founded StabiLux Biosciences, a bioscience company.

== Awards and honors ==
- 2005 – Career Award, National Science Foundation
- 2011 – Bhakta Rath Research Award, Michigan Technological University
- 2015 – Global Alumni Fellow, Osaka University
- 2018 – Research Award, Michigan Technological University
- 2020 – University Professor, Michigan Technological University

== Bibliography ==
=== Books ===
- B-C-N Nanotubes and Related Nanostructures (2009) ISBN 978-1441900852

=== Selected articles ===
- Sasaki, T., Mori, Y., Yoshimura, M., Yap, Y. K., & Kamimura, T. (2000). Recent development of nonlinear optical borate crystals: key materials for generation of visible and UV light. Materials Science and Engineering: R: Reports, 30(1–2), 1-54.
- Wang, J., Lee, C. H., & Yap, Y. K. (2010). Recent advancements in boron nitride nanotubes. Nanoscale, 2(10), 2028–2034.
- Lee, C. H., Johnson, N., Drelich, J., & Yap, Y. K. (2011). The performance of superhydrophobic and superoleophilic carbon nanotube meshes in water–oil filtration. Carbon, 49(2), 669–676.
- Lee, C. H., et al. (2013). Room-temperature tunneling behavior of boron nitride nanotubes functionalized with gold quantum dots. Advanced Materials, 25(33), 4544–4548.
- Ye, M., Winslow, D., Zhang, D., Pandey, R., Yap, Y. K. (2015). Recent advancement on the optical properties of two-dimensional molybdenum disulfide (MoS2) thin films. Photonics, 2(1), 288–307.
- Bhandari, S., Hao, B., Waters, K., Lee, C. H. Idrobo, J. C., Zhang, D., Pandey, R., Yap, Y. K.(2019). Two-dimensional gold quantum dots with tunable bandgaps. ACS Nano, 13(4) 4347–4353.
- Qin, J. K., et al. (2020). Raman response and transport properties of tellurium atomic chains encapsulated in nanotubes. Nature Electronics, 3, 141–147.
- Zhang, D., Yapici, N., Oakley, R., Yap, Y. K. (2022). The rise of boron nitride nanotubes for applications in energy harvesting, nanoelectronics, quantum materials, and biomedicine. J. Materials Research, 37 (24), 4605–4619.
