= Synthesis of hexagonal boron nitride =

Two dimensional hexagonal boron nitride (2D h-BN) is a material of comparable structure to graphene with potential applications in e.g. photonics., fuel cells and as a substrate for two-dimensional heterostructures. 2D h-BN is isostructural to graphene, but where graphene is conductive, 2D h-BN is a wide-gap insulator.

The properties of 2D h-BN films depends greatly on the quality of the films. It has been challenging to synthesize high-quality 2D h-BN over large areas. In particular, the small grain size of polycrystalline h-BN results in many grain boundaries, which create charge traps and higher surface roughness.

The production of 2D h-BN can be divided into top-down and bottom-up approaches. In bottom-up methods, a film is grown or deposited on a surface; in top-down methods, a larger structure is reduced until the desired state or structure is achieved.

== Top-down methods ==
The general idea behind top-down approaches is to take bulk h-BN, break the Van der Waals forces between the hexagonal layers and separate the resulting two-dimensional sheets of h-BN. These techniques mainly consist of mechanical and chemical exfoliation methods.

In mechanical exfoliation the atomic sheets of h-BN are physically pulled or separated from each other. For example using regular adhesive tape to peel off graphene sheets is one of the most famous mechanical exfoliation methods and similar techniques can also be used to create h-BN sheets. Generally speaking mechanical exfoliation methods can be considered as simple ways to fabricate h-BN nanosheets, but their yield can be small and the size of the fabricated structures is usually limited. On the other hand, the number of defects on the produced nanosheets has been found to be smaller compared to chemical methods.

Chemical exfoliation is carried out in liquid solvents such as dichloroethane and dimethylformamide. Sonication is used to break Van der Waals forces in h-BN crystals which allows the solvent molecules to expand the atomic layers. These methods are quite simple and can also provide a higher yield compared to mechanical exfoliation, although the samples are easily contaminated.

== Bottom-up methods ==
=== Chemical vapor deposition ===
Chemical vapor deposition (CVD) is a bottom-up chemical deposition method used to construct high-quality nanoscale films. In CVD, a substrate is exposed to precursors, which react on the wafer surface to produce the desired film. This reaction often also results in toxic byproducts. Historically, ultra-high vacuum CVD (UHVCVD) has been used for thin h-BN deposition on transition metals. More recently, CVD of h-BN has also been successful on metallic surfaces at higher pressures.

CVD is reliant on the use of reactive precursors. For h-BN, there are gaseous, liquid, and solid options to choose from, each with their respective advantages and drawbacks. Gaseous precursors, such as BF_{3}/NH_{3}, BCl_{3}/NH_{3}, and B_{2}H_{6}/NH_{3}, are toxic and require careful ratios of gases to preserve a 1:1 B/N stoichiometry. Liquid precursors, such as borazine, have equal amounts of boron and nitrogen, and do not produce highly toxic side products. However, they are sensitive to moisture, and hydrolyze readily. This drawback can be counteracted by raising the temperature, but higher temperatures also result in increased rates of reaction. Finally, for solid precursors, borazane is stable and has a 1:1 B/N stoichiometry. Its drawback is its decomposition into the highly active BH_{2}NH_{2}, which polymerizes at room temperature. Pure borazane consequently does not work as a precursors, and should be mixed with BH_{2}NH_{2} and borazine.

CVD is classified by its operation conditions into atmospheric pressure CVD (APCVD), low-pressure CVD (LPCVD) and ultra-high vacuum CVD. Higher vacuums require more sophisticated equipment, and higher operation costs, while higher pressures yield faster growth. For h-BN, APCVD has been unable to precisely control the number of layers. At least LPCVD is currently required to produce large area monolayer h-BN.

The choice of substrate in CVD is important, as the film under production must stick to the surface. In h-BN, as in graphene, transition metals such as Cu or Ni are popular choices for CVD substrate materials. Platinum has also been used as a wafer, as has iron foil and cobalt. The drawback with catalytic transition metal wafer materials is the need to transfer the result to a target substrate, such as silicon. This procedure often damages or contaminates the film. Some h-BN films have been grown on Si, SiO_{2}/Si, and sapphire

The orientation of domains on the h-BN film is affected by the choice of substrate material and its orientation. Typically, domains are triangular in LPCVD, and triangular, truncated triangular, or hexagonal in APCVD. Often, these domains are randomly oriented, but h-BN domains align strictly with copper (100) or (111) surface lattices. With Cu (110), alignment is less strict, but still strong over millimeter distances.

=== Physical vapor deposition ===
==== Sputtering ====
In sputtering, a solid target of the desired film material is bombarded with energetic particles, so that a thin film can be produced on a wafer facing the target. Ar ion beams have been used to sputter h-BN on Cu foils, resulting in high-quality, few-layer films, and magnetron sputtering of B in N2/Ar has been used to grow high-quality h-BN on Ru. This process results in films two atomic layers thick; thicker films can be grown by alternating room temperature deposition and annealing cycles.

=== Co-segregation ===
When a source of boron and nitrogen, such as amorphous BN, is sandwiched between a Co or Ni film and SiO2, it is possible to grow an atomically thin h-BN film on the metal surface by annealing the heterostructure in a vacuum. The B and N atoms dissolve in the metal bulk, diffuse through the film, and precipitate on the surface. In this way, the use of unconventional or toxic precursors is avoided.

== Other methods ==
In molecular beam epitaxy (MBE) heated gaseous elements are allowed to condense on the wafer. MBE has been used to grow h-BN films from elemental B and N on Ni foils.

Molten boron oxide reacts with gaseous ammonia to form an ultrathin h-BN film at the reaction interface. The film grows to 20-30 nm in thickness, after which the process self-terminates, the setup is cooled down, and the boron oxide can be dissolved in water.
