= Boron nitride nanosheet =

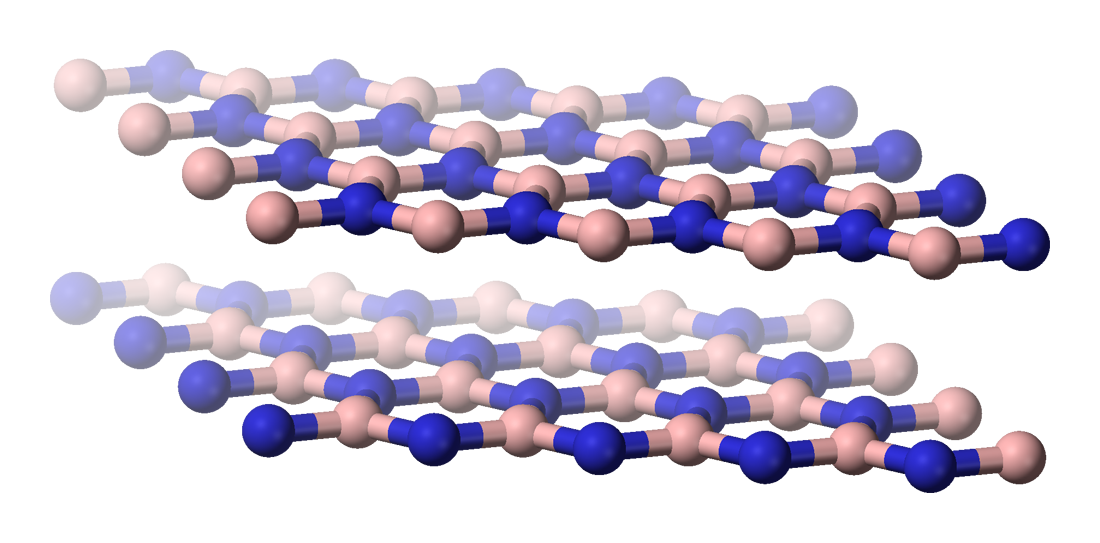
Two-layer BN nanosheet.

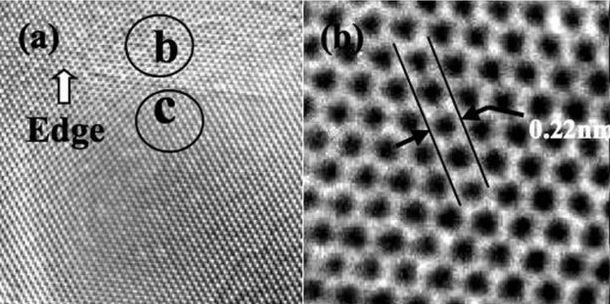
Atomic-resolution images of a BN nanosheet prepared by CVD.

Boron nitride nanosheet is a crystalline form of the hexagonal boron nitride (h-BN) with a thickness of one atom. Similar in geometry as well as physical and thermal properties to its carbon analog, graphene, it has very different chemical and electronic properties. Unlike graphene, which is black and highly conductive, BN nanosheets are electrical insulators with a band gap of ~5.9 eV. They therefore appear white in color.

Uniform monoatomic BN nanosheets can be deposited by catalytic decomposition of borazine at a temperature of ~1100 °C in a chemical vapor deposition apparatus, over substrate areas up to about 10 cm^{2}. Because of their hexagonal atomic structure, small lattice mismatch with graphene (~2%), and high uniformity, they can be used as substrates for graphene-based devices.

== Structure ==
BN nanosheets consist of sp^{2}-conjugated boron and nitrogen atoms that form a honeycomb structure. They contain two different edges: armchair and zig-zag. The armchair edge consists of either boron or nitrogen atoms, while the zig-zag edge consists of alternating boron and nitrogen atoms. These 2D structures can stack on top of each other and are held by Van der Waals forces to form few-layer boron nitride nanosheets. In these structures, the boron atoms of one sheet are positioned on top of or below the nitrogen atoms due to the electron-deficient nature of boron and electron-rich nature of nitrogen.

== Synthesis ==
=== CVD ===
Chemical vapor deposition is the most common method to produce BN nanosheets because it is a well-established and highly controllable process that yields high-quality material over areas exceeding 10 cm^{2}. There is a wide range of boron and nitride precursors for CVD synthesis, such as borazine, and their selection depends on toxicity, stability, reactivity, and the nature of the CVD method.

=== Mechanical cleavage ===
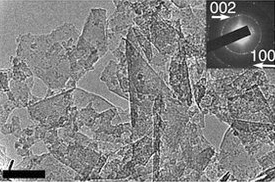
A typical electron micrograph of BN nanosheets prepared by ball milling (scale bar 50 nm).

Mechanical cleaving methods of boron nitride use shear forces to break the weak van der Waals interactions between the BN layers. Cleaved nanosheets have low defect densities and retain the lateral size of the original substrate. Inspired by its use in the isolation of graphene, micromechanical cleavage, also known as the Scotch-tape method, has been used to consistently isolate few-layer and monolayer boron nitride nanosheets by subsequent exfoliation of the starting material with adhesive tape. The disadvantage of this technique is that it is not scalable for large-scale production.

Boron nitride sheets can be also exfoliated by ball milling, where shear forces are applied on the face of bulk boron nitride by rolling balls. This technique yields large quantities of low-quality material with poor control over its properties.

=== Unzipping of boron nitride nanotubes ===
BN nanosheets can be synthesized by the unzipping of boron nitride nanotubes via potassium intercalation, or etching by plasma, or an inert gas. Here the intercalation method has a relatively low yield, as boron nitride is resistive to the effects of intercalants. In situ unzipping of boron nitride nanotubes to nanoribbons was achieved by Li et al.

=== Solvent exfoliation and sonication ===
Solvent exfoliation is often used in tandem with sonication to isolate large quantities of boron nitride nanosheets. Polar solvents such as isopropyl alcohol and DMF are more effective in exfoliating boron nitride layers than nonpolar solvents because these solvents possess a similar surface energy to the surface energy of boron nitride nanosheets. Combinations of different solvents also exfoliate boron nitride better than individual solvents. Many solvents suitable for BN exfoliation are rather toxic and expensive, but they can be replaced by water and isopropyl alcohol without significantly sacrificing the yield.

=== Chemical functionalization and sonication ===
Chemical functionalization of boron nitride involves attaching molecules onto the outer and inner layers of bulk boron nitride. There are three types of BN functionalization: covalent, ionic and or non-covalent. Layers are exfoliated by placing the functionalized BN into a solvent and allowing the solvation force between the attached groups and the solvent to break the van der Waal forces between BN layers. This method is slightly different from solvent exfoliation, which relies on the similarities between the surface energies of the solvent and boron nitride layers.

=== Solid state reactions ===
Heating a mixture of boron and nitrogen precursors, such as boric acid and urea, can produce boron nitride nanosheets. The number of layers in these nanosheets was controlled by temperature (ca. 900 ˚C) and the urea content.

== Properties and applications ==
Mechanical properties. Monolayer boron nitride has an average Young's modulus of 0.865 TPa and fracture strength of 70.5 GPa. In contrast to graphene, whose strength decreases dramatically with increased thickness, few-layer boron nitride sheets have a strength similar to that of monolayer boron nitride.

Thermal conductivity. The thermal conductivity of atomically thin boron nitride is one of the highest among semiconductors and electrical insulators; it increases with reduced thickness due to less intra-layer coupling.

Thermal stability. The air stability of graphene shows a clear thickness dependence: monolayer graphene is reactive to oxygen at 250 °C, strongly doped at 300 °C, and etched at 450 °C; in contrast, bulk graphite is not oxidized until 800 °C. Atomically thin boron nitride has much better oxidation resistance than graphene. Monolayer boron nitride is not oxidized till 700 °C and can sustain up to 850 °C in air; bilayer and trilayer boron nitride nanosheets have slightly higher oxidation starting temperatures. The excellent thermal stability, high impermeability to gas and liquid, and electrical insulation make atomically thin boron nitride potential coating materials for preventing surface oxidation and corrosion of metals and other two-dimensional (2D) materials, such as black phosphorus.

Better surface adsorption. Atomically thin boron nitride has been found to have better surface adsorption capabilities than bulk hexagonal boron nitride. According to theoretical and experimental studies, atomically thin boron nitride as an adsorbent experiences conformational changes upon surface adsorption of molecules, increasing adsorption energy and efficiency. The synergic effect of the atomic thickness, high flexibility, stronger surface adsorption capability, electrical insulation, impermeability, high thermal and chemical stability of BN nanosheets can increase the Raman sensitivity by up to two orders, and in the meantime attain long-term stability and extraordinary reusability not achievable by other materials.

Dielectric properties. Atomically thin hexagonal boron nitride is an excellent dielectric substrate for graphene, molybdenum disulphide (MoS_{2}), and many other 2D material-based electronic and photonic devices. As shown by electric force microscopy (EFM) studies, the electric field screening in atomically thin boron nitride shows a weak dependence on thickness, which is in line with the smooth decay of electric field inside few-layer boron nitride revealed by the first-principles calculations.

Raman characteristics. Raman spectroscopy has been a useful tool to study a variety of 2D materials, and the Raman signature of high-quality atomically thin boron nitride was first reported by Gorbachev et al. and Li et al. However, the two reported Raman results of monolayer boron nitride did not agree with each other. Cai et al. conducted systematic experimental and theoretical studies of the intrinsic Raman spectrum of atomically thin boron nitride. They reveal that, in absence of interaction with a substrate, atomically thin boron nitride has a G-band frequency similar to that of bulk hexagonal boron nitride, but strain induced by the substrate can cause Raman shifts. Nevertheless, the Raman intensity of G-band can be used to estimate layer thickness and sample quality.

BN nanosheets are electrical insulators and have a wide band gap of ~5.9 eV, which can be changed by the presence of Stone–Wales defects within the structure, by doping or functionalization, or by changing the number of layers. Owing to their hexagonal atomic structure, small lattice mismatch with graphene (~2%), and high uniformity, BN nanosheets are used as substrates for graphene-based devices. BN nanosheets are also excellent proton conductors. Their high proton transport rate, combined with the high electrical resistance, may lead to applications in fuel cells and water electrolysis.
