= Carborazine =

Names
- Preferred IUPAC name 1,4,2,5-Diazadiborinine

Identifiers
CAS Number	289-43-0
3D model (JSmol)	Interactive image
ChemSpider	67175927
PubChem CID	85779007
CompTox Dashboard (EPA)	DTXSID801337040
- InChI: InChI=1S/C2H2B2N2/c1-3-6-2-4-5-1/h1-2H Key: ZADCQHPUUMQREX-UHFFFAOYSA-N
- SMILES: B1=CN=BC=N1

Properties
Chemical formula	C_{2}H_{2}B_{2}N_{2}
Molar mass	75.67 g·mol^{−1}
- Except where otherwise noted, data are given for materials in their standard state (at 25 °C [77 °F], 100 kPa). Infobox references

Carborazine is a six-membered aromatic ring with two carbon atoms, two nitrogen atoms and two boron atoms in opposing pairs.

== See also ==
- 1,2-Dihydro-1,2-azaborine — an aromatic chemical compound with properties intermediate between benzene and borazine.
- Borazine
