= Qingsongite =

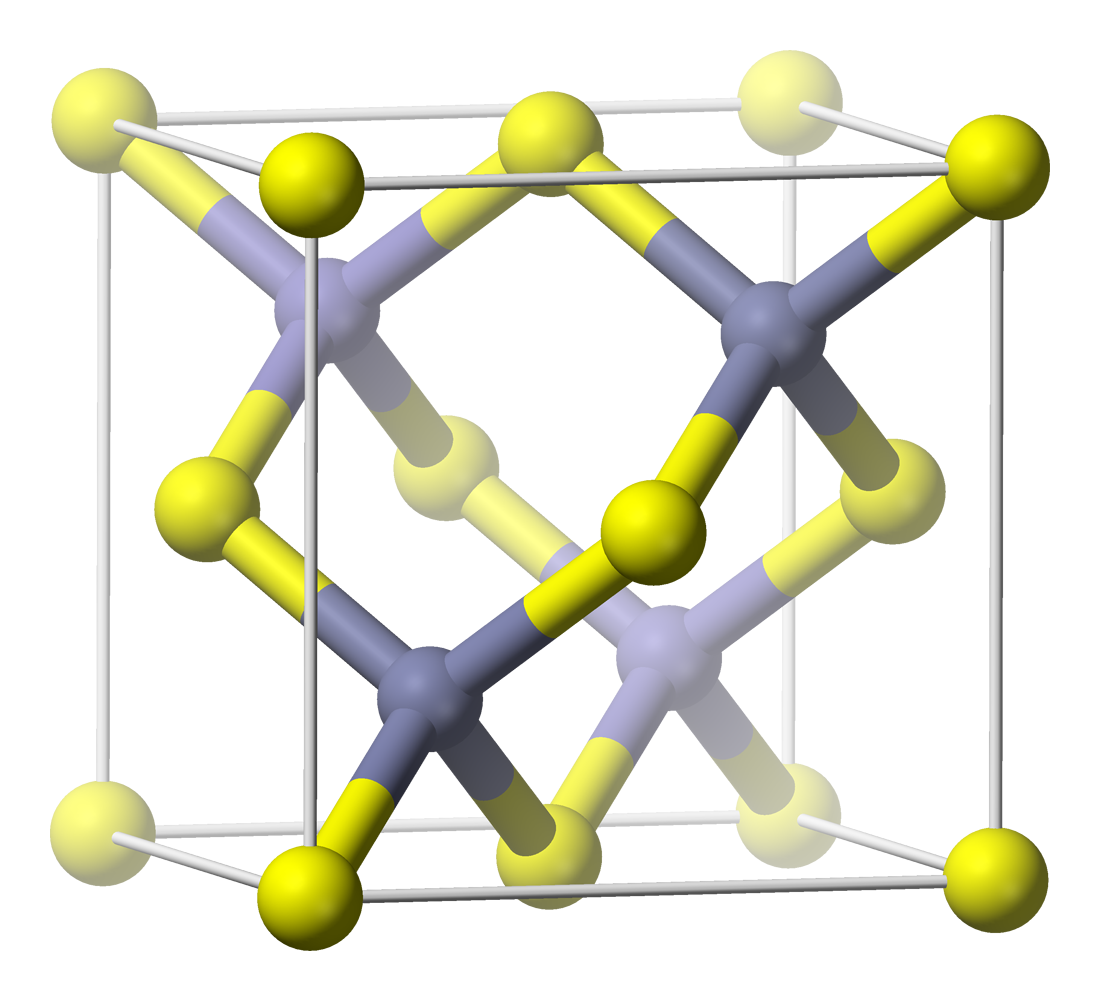
- Crystal structure

General
- Category: Native element minerals: nitrides
- Formula: BN
- IMA symbol: Qsg
- Crystal system: Cubic
- Crystal class: Hextetrahedral (4̅3m); H-M symbol: (4̅3m)
- Space group: F4̅3m
- Unit cell: a = 3.61 Å; Z = 4

Identification
- Color: White
- Crystal habit: Inclusions in chromium-rich rocks
- Cleavage: Good {011}
- Mohs scale hardness: 9 - 10
- Luster: Adamantine
- Streak: White
- Other characteristics: Not radioactive, non-magnetic

Qingsongite /ˈtʃɪŋsɒŋaɪt/ (Chinese: 青松石) is a rare boron nitride mineral with cubic crystalline form. It was first described in 2009 for an occurrence as minute inclusions within chromite deposits in the Luobusa ophiolite in the Shannan Prefecture, Tibet Autonomous Region, China. It was recognized as a mineral in August 2013 by the International Mineralogical Association. It is named after Chinese geologist Qingsong Fang (1939–2010). Qingsongite is the only known boron mineral that is formed deep in the Earth's mantle. Associated minerals or phases include osbornite (titanium nitride), coesite, kyanite and amorphous carbon.

== Characterization ==
The mineral description published in 2014 used chemical analysis and transmission electron microscopy to characterize qingsongite. Energy-dispersive X-ray analysis identified boron and nitrogen, while fast Fourier transform analysis of high-resolution lattice images supported cubic symmetry with a lattice parameter of 3.61 ± 0.045 Å.

A density of 3.46 g/cm^{3} was calculated from the measured composition and lattice parameter. Because the natural crystals were too small for some physical-property measurements, the description cited properties of synthetic cubic boron nitride, including a Mohs hardness of 9–10 and {011} cleavage.
