= Hexachloroborazine =

Names
- IUPAC name 2,2,4,4,6,6-hexachloro-1,3,5,2,4,6-triazatriborinane
- Other names: Hexachloroborazole; B-Trichloroborazine; Perchloroborazine

Identifiers
CAS Number	19087-72-0
3D model (JSmol)	Interactive image
PubChem CID	17995347
- InChI: InChI=1S/B3Cl6N3/c4-1-10(7)2(5)12(9)3(6)11(1)8 Key: TXTZMNUFKFLXLL-UHFFFAOYSA-N
- SMILES: B1(N(B(N(B(N1Cl)Cl)Cl)Cl)Cl)Cl

Properties
Chemical formula	B_{3}Cl_{6}N_{3}
Molar mass	287.15 g·mol^{−1}
Appearance	white crystals
Density	g/cm^{3}
Melting point	95 °C (203 °F; 368 K)

Hazards
Flash point	°C
- Except where otherwise noted, data are given for materials in their standard state (at 25 °C [77 °F], 100 kPa). Infobox references

Hexachloroborazine is an inorganic compound with the chemical formula B_{3}Cl_{6}N_{3}. This is a fully chlorinated derivative of borazine (B_{3}N_{3}H_{6}), a cyclic compound often referred to as "inorganic benzene" due to its structural and electronic similarity to benzene.

== Structure ==
Hexachloroborazine features a planar, six-membered ring with alternating boron and nitrogen atoms, analogous to the carbon ring in benzene. Each boron atom is bonded to one chlorine atom, while each nitrogen atom bears a lone pair of electrons. The B–N bond lengths are approximately 1.44 Å, intermediate between single and double bonds, indicating significant π-delocalization across the ring. The molecule possesses D_{3h} symmetry and is isoelectronic and isostructural with hexachlorobenzene (C_{6}Cl_{6}), though the electronic distribution differs due to the polarity of the B–N bonds.

== Synthesis ==
Hexachloroborazine was first prepared by thermal decomposition of dichloroborazide at 200 °C. However, this method gives low yields and is very dangerous due to the risk of explosions. A more advantageous method is the reaction of boron trichloride and nitrogen trichloride in carbon tetrachloride at 45 °C.

3BCl_{3} + 3NCl_{3} ⟶ B_{3}Cl_{6}N_{3} + 6Cl_{2}

== Physical properties ==
The compound forms white powder that crystallizes in the trigonal crystal system in the space group R3.

== Uses ==
Hexachloroborazine is of interest in inorganic chemistry, materials science, and the synthesis of boron nitride-based materials.

The compound is used as a precursor to boron nitride materials—used in the synthesis of thin films, fibers, and ceramics via chemical vapor deposition (CVD) or polymer-derived ceramic (PDC) routes.
