= Nitridoborate =

Chemical compounds of boron and nitrogen with metals

The nitridoborates are chemical compounds of boron and nitrogen with metals. These compounds are typically produced at high temperature by reacting hexagonal boron nitride (α -BN) with metal nitrides or by metathesis reactions involving nitridoborates. A wide range of these compounds have been made involving lithium, alkaline earth metals and lanthanides, and their structures determined using crystallographic techniques such as X-ray crystallography. Structurally one of their interesting features is the presence of polyatomic anions of boron and nitrogen where the geometry and the B–N bond length have been interpreted in terms of π-bonding.

Many of the compounds produced can be described as ternary compounds of metal boron and nitrogen and examples of these are Li_{3}BN_{2}, Mg_{3}BN_{3}, La_{3}B_{3}N_{6}, La_{5}B_{4}N_{9}. However, there are examples of compounds with more than one metal, for example La_{3}Ni_{2}B_{2}N_{3} and compounds containing anions such as Cl^{−}, for example Mg_{2}BN_{2}Cl.

== Structures and bonding ==
Examination of the crystallographic data shows the presence of polyatomic units consisting of boron and nitrogen. These units have structures similar to those of isoelectronic anions, which have π-bonded structures. The bonding in some of these compounds is ionic in character, such as Ca_{3}[BN_{2}]_{2}, other compounds have metallic characteristics, where the bonding has been described in terms of π-bonded anions with extra electrons in anti-bonding orbitals that not only cause a lengthening of the B–N bonds but also form part of the conduction band of the solid. The simplest ion BN^{n−} is comparable to the C^{2−}_{2} ion, but attempts to prepare the compound CaBN analogous to CaC_{2} calcium carbide failed. The bonding of compounds containing the diatomic BN anion have been explained in terms of electrons entering anti-bonding orbitals and reducing the B–N bond order from 3 (triple bond) in BN^{2−} to 2 (double bond) in BN^{4−}.

Some nitridoborates are salt-like such as Li_{3}BN_{2}, LiCa_{4}[BN_{2}]_{3} others have a metallic lustre, such as LiEu_{4}[BN_{2}]_{3}. Bonding calculations show that the energy of the valence orbitals of metal atoms of group 2 and lanthanide elements are higher than those of the bonding orbitals in BN_{x} ions which indicates an ionic like interaction between a metal atom and a BN_{x} ion. With lanthanide compounds where extra electrons enter the anti-bonding orbitals of an ion there can be a smaller band gap giving the compounds metal like properties such as lustre. With transition metals the d orbitals can be similar in energy to bonding orbitals in the BN anions suggesting covalent interactions.

anion	geometry	Typical B–N bond length (pm)	B-B bond length (pm)	isoelectronic with	Examples of compounds
BN^{n−}	linear	138–202			CaNiBN,(Ca^{2+}Ni^{2+}BN^{4−}); LaNiBN, (La^{3+}Ni^{2+}BN^{4−}(e^{−}))
BN^{3−}_{2}	linear	132–137		[CN_{2}]^{2−}, CO_{2}	Ca_{3}(BN_{2})_{2}
BN^{6−}_{3}	trigonal planar	145–149		BO^{3−}_{3}, CO^{2−}_{3}	La_{6}(BN_{3})O_{6}
B_{2}N^{8−}_{4}	planar	147–150	177–182	C_{2}O^{2−}_{4}	La_{3}B_{2}N_{4}, ((La^{3+})_{3}(B_{2}N^{8−}_{4})(e^{−}))
B_{3}N^{9−}_{6}	planar or chair form	144–151			La_{3}B_{3}N_{6}

For comparison purposes the following are considered to be typical BN bond lengths

Compound	B–N (pm)	Bond type
Me_{3}N·BBr_{3}	160.2	single
Me_{3}N·BCl_{3}	157.5	single
Cubic BN	157	Single
Hexagonal BN	144.6	intra-layer distance some π-bonding
B(NMe_{2})_{3}	143.9	some π-bonding
Mes_{2}BNBMes_{2}	134.5	double bond
(t-Bu)BN(t-Bu)	125.8	triple bond
