= Borazine =

Boron compound

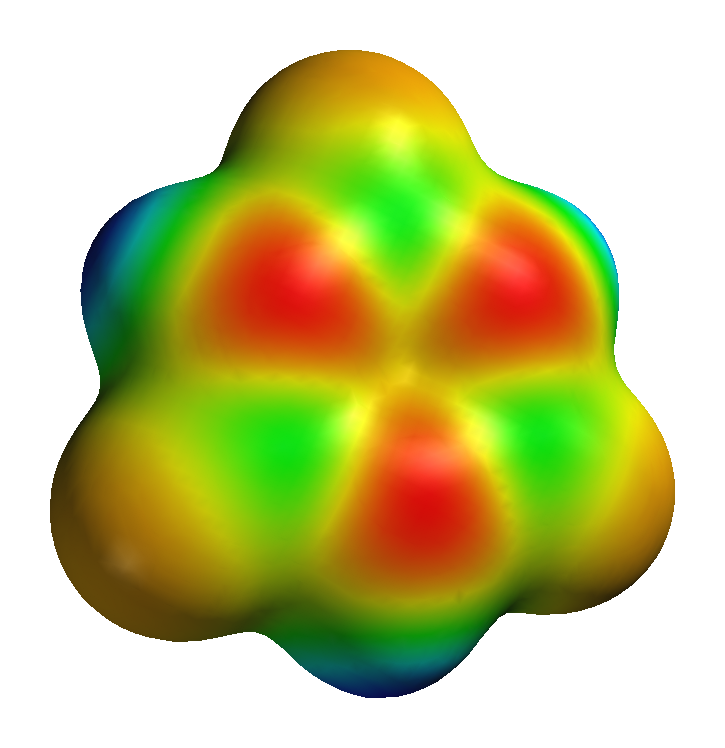

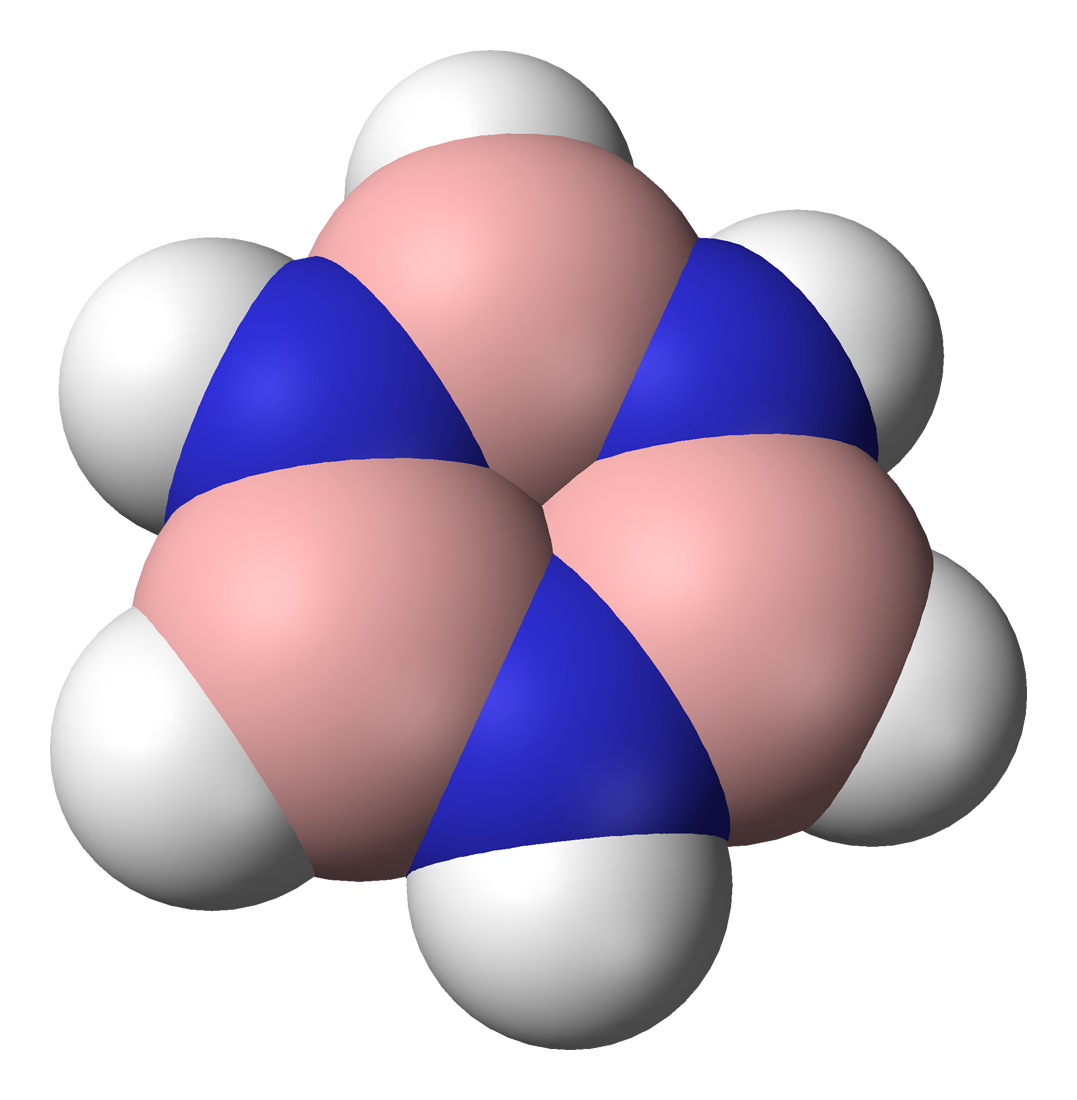

Names
- Preferred IUPAC name 1,3,5,2,4,6-Triazatriborinane (only preselected)
- Other names Cyclotriborazaneborazol; Inorganic benzene Borazole

Identifiers
CAS Number	6569-51-3
3D model (JSmol)	Interactive image
ChEBI	CHEBI:33119
ChemSpider	122374
ECHA InfoCard	100.169.303
PubChem CID	138768
UNII	CEM55A0275
CompTox Dashboard (EPA)	DTXSID60894104
- InChI: InChI=1S/B3H6N3/c1-4-2-6-3-5-1/h1-6H Key: BGECDVWSWDRFSP-UHFFFAOYSA-N; InChI=1/B3H6N3/c1-4-2-6-3-5-1/h1-6H Key: BGECDVWSWDRFSP-UHFFFAOYAU
- SMILES: [BH-]1-[NH+]=[BH-]-[NH+]=[BH-]-[NH+]=1

Properties
Chemical formula	B_{3}H_{6}N_{3}
Molar mass	80.50 g/mol
Appearance	Colorless liquid
Density	0.81 g/cm^{3}
Melting point	−58 °C (−72 °F; 215 K)
Boiling point	53 °C (127 °F; 326 K) (55 °C at 105 Pa)
Magnetic susceptibility (χ)	−49.6·10^{−6} cm^{3}/mol

Hazards
NFPA 704 (fire diamond)	2 2 1
- Except where otherwise noted, data are given for materials in their standard state (at 25 °C [77 °F], 100 kPa). verify (what is ?) Infobox references

Borazine, also known as borazole, inorganic benzene, is an inorganic compound with the chemical formula B_{3}H_{6}N_{3}. In this cyclic compound, the three BH units and three NH units alternate. The compound is isoelectronic and isostructural with benzene. For this reason borazine is sometimes referred to as “inorganic benzene”. Like benzene, borazine is a colourless liquid with an aromatic odor.

== Synthesis ==
The compound was reported in 1926 by the chemists Alfred Stock and Erich Pohland by a reaction of diborane with ammonia.

Borazine can be synthesized by treating diborane and ammonia in a 1:2 ratio at 250–300 °C with a conversion of 50%.

3 B_{2}H_{6} + 6 NH_{3} → 2 B_{3}H_{6}N_{3} + 12 H_{2}

An alternative more efficient route begins with sodium borohydride and ammonium sulfate:

6 NaBH_{4} + 3 (NH_{4})_{2}SO_{4} → 2 B_{3}N_{3}H_{6} + 3 Na_{2}SO_{4} + 18 H_{2}

In a two-step process to borazine, boron trichloride is first converted to trichloroborazine:

3 BCl_{3} + 3 NH_{4}Cl → Cl_{3}B_{3}H_{3}N_{3} + 9 HCl

The B-Cl bonds are subsequently converted to B-H bonds:

2 Cl_{3}B_{3}H_{3}N_{3} + 6 NaBH_{4} → 2 B_{3}H_{6}N_{3} + 3 B_{2}H_{6} + 6 NaCl

== Structure ==
Borazine is isoelectronic with benzene and has similar connectivity, so it is sometimes referred to as "inorganic benzene". This comparison is not rigorously valid due to the electronegativity difference between boron and nitrogen. X-ray crystallographic structural determinations show that the bond lengths within the borazine ring are all equivalent at 1.429 Å, a property shared by benzene. However, the borazine ring does not form a perfect hexagon. The bond angle is 117.1° at the boron atoms and 122.9° at the nitrogens, giving the molecule the D_{3h} symmetry point group.

The electronegativity of boron (2.04 on the Pauling scale) compared to that of nitrogen (3.04) and also the electron deficiency on the boron atom and the lone pair on nitrogen favor alternative mesomer structures for borazine.

Boron behaves as a Lewis acid and nitrogen behaves as a Lewis base.

== Aromaticity ==
Due to its similarities to benzene, there have been a number of computational and experimental analyses of borazine's aromaticity. The number of pi electrons in borazine obeys the 4n + 2 rule, and the B-N bond lengths are equal, which suggests the compound may be aromatic. The electronegativity difference between boron and nitrogen, however, creates an unequal sharing of charge which results in bonds with greater ionic character, and thus it is expected to have poorer delocalization of electrons than the all-carbon analog. Borazine, with a standard enthalpy change of formation Δ_{f}H of −531 kJ/mol, is thermally very stable.

=== Natural bond orbitals (NBO) ===
Natural bond orbital (NBO) analysis suggests weak aromaticity in borazine. In the NBO model, B-N bonds in the ring are slightly displaced from the nuclear axes, and B and N have large differences in charge. Natural chemical shielding (NCS) analysis provides some further evidence for aromaticity based on a contribution of the B-N π bond to magnetic shielding. Computations based on NBO orbitals show that this π bond allows for weak ring current which somewhat counteracts a magnetic field simulated at the center of the borazine ring. A small ring current does suggest some delocalization.

=== Electron localization function (ELF) ===
Topological analysis of bonding in borazine by the electron localization function (ELF) indicates that borazine can be described as a π aromatic compound. However, the bonding in borazine is less delocalized than in benzene based on a difference in bifurcation values of the electron basins. Larger bifurcation values indicate better electron delocalization, and it is argued that when this bifurcation value is greater than 0.70, the delocalization is sufficient to designate a compound aromatic. For benzene, this value is 0.91, but the borazine π system bifurcates at the ELF value 0.682. This is caused by the difference in electronegativity between B and N, which produces a weaker bond interaction than the C-C interaction in benzene, leading to increased localization of electrons on the B-H and N-H units. The bifurcation value is slightly below the limit of 0.70 which suggests moderate aromaticity.

== Reactivity ==
=== Hydrolysis ===
Borazine hydrolyzes readily, yielding boric acid, ammonia, and hydrogen.

=== Polymerization ===
Polyborazylene

Heating borazine at 70 °C expels hydrogen with formation of polyborazylene:

n B_{3}N_{3}H_{6} → [B_{3}N_{3}H_{4}]_{n} + n H_{2}

=== With hydrogen halides and halogens ===
With hydrogen chloride it forms an adduct.

B_{3}N_{3}H_{6} + 3 HCl → B_{3}N_{3}H_{9}Cl_{3}
Addition reaction of borazine with hydrogen chloride

B_{3}N_{3}H_{9}Cl_{3} + NaBH_{4} → (BH_{4}N)_{3}
Reduction with sodium borohydride

The addition reaction with bromine does not require a catalyst. Borazines undergo nucleophilic attack at boron and electrophilic attack at nitrogen.

=== Ceramic precursor ===
Boron nitride can be prepared by heating polyborazylene to 1000 °C.

Borazines are also starting materials for other potential ceramics such as boron carbonitrides. Borazine can also be used as a precursor to grow hexagonal boron nitride (h-BN) thin films and single layers on catalytic surfaces such as copper, platinum, nickel iron and many more, with chemical vapor deposition (CVD).

synthetic route to boron carbonitrides, first step a hydroboration reaction to an oligomeric precursor followed by step two: pyrolysis

Polyborazylene has been proposed as a recycled hydrogen storage medium for hydrogen fuel cell vehicle applications, using a "single pot" process for digestion and reduction to recreate ammonia borane.

Among other B-N type compounds mixed amino-nitro substituted borazines have been predicted to outperform carbon based explosives such as CL-20.

== Related compounds ==
Carborazine (C_{2}H_{2}B_{2}N_{2}) is a six-membered aromatic ring with two carbon atoms, two nitrogen atoms, and two boron atoms in opposing pairs.

1,2-Dihydro-1,2-azaborine (C_{4}BNH_{6}) is a six-membered ring with four carbon atoms, one nitrogen atom, and one boron atom.

== See also ==
- Iminoborane
- Hexachloroborazine
