= Boron arsenide =

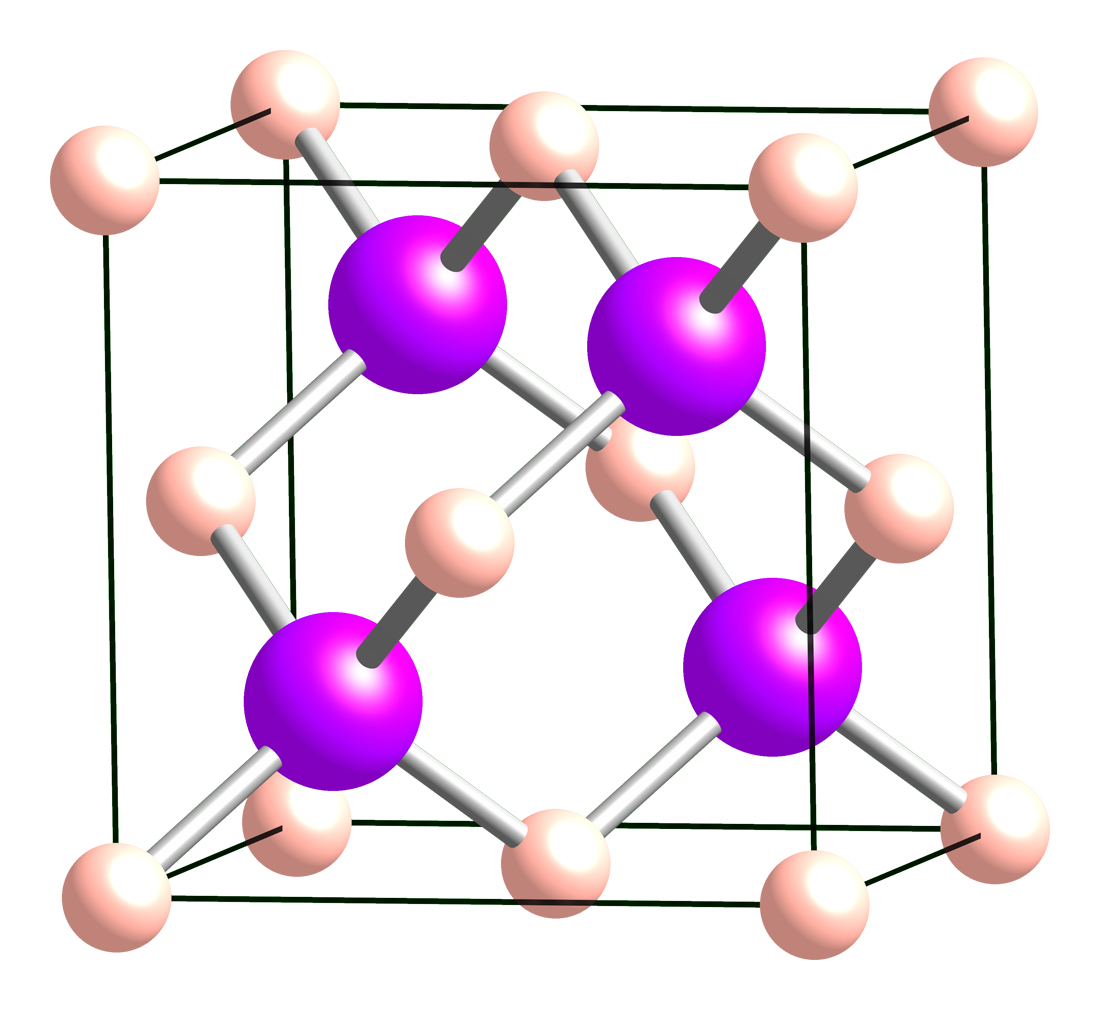

Identifiers
CAS Number	12005-69-5
3D model (JSmol)	Interactive image
ChemSpider	8461243
PubChem CID	10285774
- InChI: InChI=1S/AsB/c1-2 Key: DBKNIEBLJMAJHX-UHFFFAOYSA-N
- SMILES: [B]#[As]

Properties
Chemical formula	BAs
Molar mass	85.733 g/mol
Appearance	Brown cubic crystals
Density	5.22 g/cm^{3}
Melting point	1,100 °C (2,010 °F; 1,370 K) decomposes
Solubility in water	Insoluble
Band gap	1.82 eV
Thermal conductivity	1300 W/(m·K) (300 K)

Structure
Crystal structure	Cubic (sphalerite), cF8, No. 216
Space group	F4̅3m
Lattice constant	a = 0.4777 nm
Formula units (Z)	4

Related compounds
Other anions	Boron nitride Boron phosphide Boron antimonide
Other cations	Aluminium arsenide Gallium arsenide Indium arsenide
- Except where otherwise noted, data are given for materials in their standard state (at 25 °C [77 °F], 100 kPa). verify (what is ?) Infobox references

Boron subarsenide
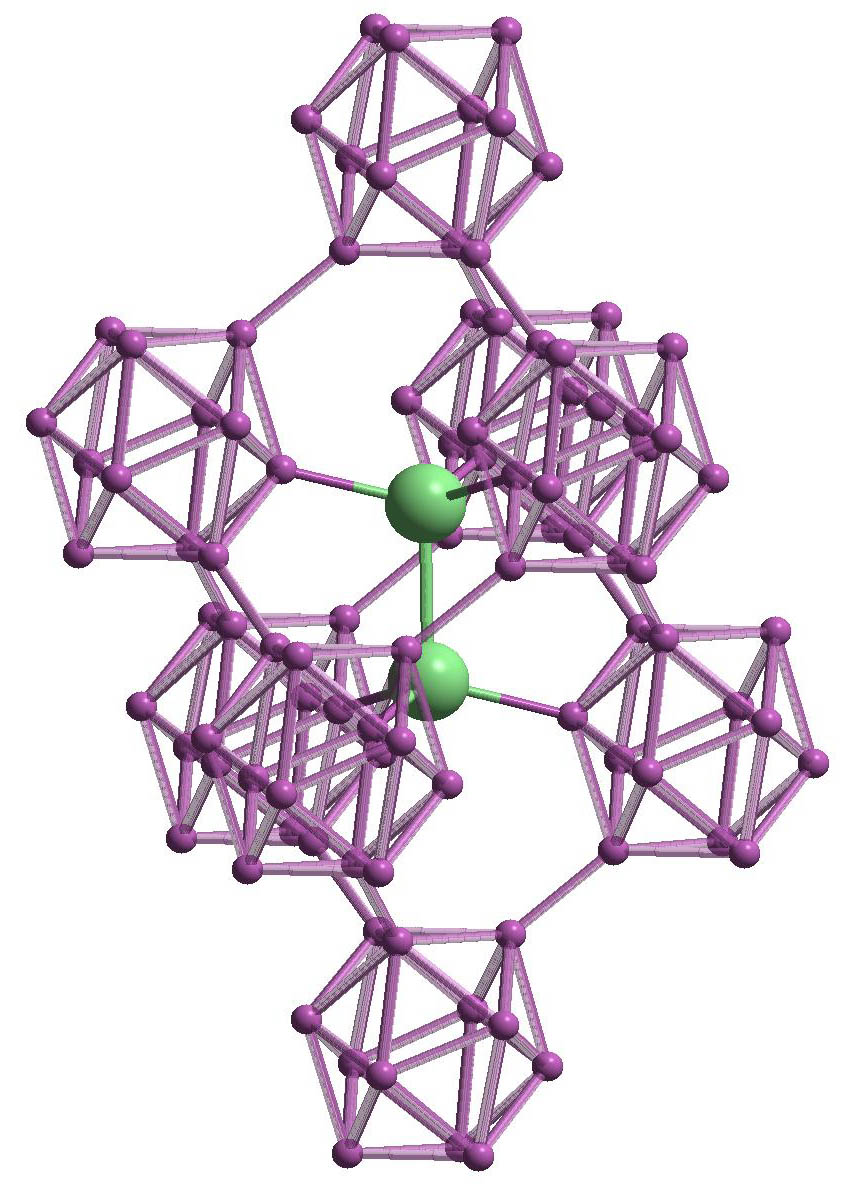

Identifiers
CAS Number	12005-70-8
3D model (JSmol)	Interactive image
- InChI: InChI=1S/2AsH2.B12/c;;1-2-3(1)5(1)6(1)4(1,2)8(2)7(2,3)9(3,5)11(5,6)10(4,6,8)12(7,8,9)11/h2*1H2; Key: RGSVMMFVXFQAMT-UHFFFAOYSA-N
- SMILES: [B]1234[B]567[B]189[B]2%10%11[B]8%12%13[B]%10%14%15[B]%16%17%18[B]35([B]6%16%19[B]%12%14%17[B]79%13%19)[B]4%11%15%18.[As].[As]

Properties
Chemical formula	B_{12}As_{2}
Molar mass	279.58 g/mol
Density	3.56 g/cm^{3}
Solubility in water	Insoluble
Band gap	3.47 eV

Structure
Crystal structure	Rhombohedral, hR42, No. 166
Space group	R3̅m
Lattice constant	a = 0.6149 nm, b = 0.6149 nm, c = 1.1914 nm α = 90°, β = 90°, γ = 120°
Formula units (Z)	6

Related compounds
Other anions	Boron suboxide
- Except where otherwise noted, data are given for materials in their standard state (at 25 °C [77 °F], 100 kPa). Infobox references

Boron arsenide (or Arsenic boride) is a chemical compound involving boron and arsenic, usually with a chemical formula BAs. Other boron arsenide compounds are known, such as the subarsenide B_{12}As_{2}. Chemical synthesis of cubic BAs is very challenging and its single crystal forms usually have defects.

== Properties ==
BAs is a cubic (sphalerite) semiconductor in the III-V family with a lattice constant of 0.4777 nm and an indirect band gap of 1.82 eV. Cubic BAs is reported to decompose to the subarsenide B_{12}As_{2} at temperatures above 920 °C. Boron arsenide has a melting point of 2076 °C. The thermal conductivity of BAs is exceptionally high, measured in single-crystal BAs to be around 1300 W/(m·K) at room temperature, making it the highest among all metals and semiconductors.

The basic physical properties of cubic BAs have been experimentally measured: Band gap (1.82 eV), optical refractive index (3.29 at wavelength 657 nm), elastic modulus (326 GPa), shear modulus, Poisson's ratio, thermal expansion coefficient (3.85×10^{−6}/K), and heat capacity.

It can be alloyed with gallium arsenide to produce ternary and with indium gallium arsenide to form quaternary semiconductors.

BAs has high electron and hole mobility, >1000 cm^{2}/V/second, unlike silicon which has high electron mobility, but low hole mobility.

In 2023, a study in journal Nature reported that subjected to high pressure BAs decreases its thermal conductivity contrary to the typical increase seen in most materials.

== Boron subarsenide ==
Boron arsenide also occurs as subarsenides, including the icosahedral boride B_{12}As_{2}. It belongs to R3̅m space group with a rhombohedral structure based on clusters of boron atoms and two-atom As–As chains. It is a wide-bandgap semiconductor (3.47 eV) with the extraordinary ability to "self-heal" radiation damage. This form can be grown on substrates such as silicon carbide. Another use for solar cell fabrication was proposed, but it is not currently used for this purpose.

== Applications ==
Boron arsenide is most attractive for use in electronics thermal management. Experimental integration with gallium nitride transistors to form GaN-BAs heterostructures has been demonstrated and shows better performance than the best GaN HEMT devices on silicon carbide or diamond substrates. Manufacturing BAs composites was developed as highly conducting and flexible thermal interfaces.

First-principles calculations have predicted that the thermal conductivity of cubic BAs is remarkably high, over 2,200 W/(m·K) at room temperature, which is comparable to that of diamond and graphite. Subsequent measurements yielded a value of only 190 W/(m·K) due to the high density of defects. More recent first-principles calculations incorporating four-phonon scattering predict a thermal conductivity of 1400 W/(m·K). Later, defect-free boron arsenide crystals have been experimentally realized and measured with an ultrahigh thermal conductivity of 1300 W/(m·K), consistent with theory predictions. Crystals with small density of defects have shown thermal conductivity of 900–1000 W/(m·K).

The cubic-shaped boron arsenide has been discovered to be better at conducting heat and electricity than silicon, as well as reportedly better than silicon at conducting both electrons and its positively charged counterpart, the "electron-hole."
