= Boron nitride =

Refractory compound of boron and nitrogen with formula BN

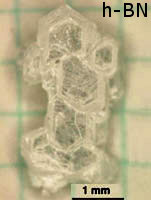
- Magnified sample of crystalline hexagonal boron nitride

Names
- IUPAC name Boron nitride

Identifiers
CAS Number	10043-11-5
3D model (JSmol)	Interactive image
ChEBI	CHEBI:50883
ChemSpider	59612
ECHA InfoCard	100.030.111
EC Number	233-136-6
Gmelin Reference	216
MeSH	Elbor
PubChem CID	66227
RTECS number	ED7800000
UNII	2U4T60A6YD
CompTox Dashboard (EPA)	DTXSID5051498
- InChI: InChI=1S/BN/c1-2 Key: PZNSFCLAULLKQX-UHFFFAOYSA-N; InChI=1S/B2N2/c1-3-2-4-1 Key: AMPXHBZZESCUCE-UHFFFAOYSA-N; InChI=1S/B3N3/c1-4-2-6-3-5-1 Key: WHDCVGLBMWOYDC-UHFFFAOYSA-N; InChI=1/BN/c1-2 Key: PZNSFCLAULLKQX-UHFFFAOYAL
- SMILES: B#N

Properties
Chemical formula	BN
Molar mass	24.82 g/mol
Appearance	Colorless crystals
Density	2.1 g/cm^{3} (h-BN); 3.45 g/cm^{3} (c-BN)
Melting point	2,973 °C (5,383 °F; 3,246 K) sublimates (c-BN)
Solubility in water	Insoluble
Electron mobility	200 cm^{2}/(V·s) (c-BN)
Refractive index (n_{D})	1.8 (h-BN); 2.1 (c-BN)

Structure
Crystal structure	Hexagonal, sphalerite, wurtzite

Thermochemistry
Heat capacity (C)	19.7 J/(K·mol)
Std molar entropy (S^{⦵}_{298})	14.8 J/K mol
Std enthalpy of formation (Δ_{f}H^{⦵}_{298})	−254.4 kJ/mol
Gibbs free energy (Δ_{f}G^{⦵})	−228.4 kJ/mol

Hazards
- GHS labelling
Pictograms	(GHS07: Exclamation mark)
Signal word	Warning
Hazard statements	H319, H335, H413
Precautionary statements	P261, P264, P271, P273, P280, P304+P340, P305+P351+P338, P312, P337+P313, P403+P233, P405, P501
NFPA 704 (fire diamond)	0 0 0

Related compounds
Related compounds	Boron arsenide; Boron carbide; Boron phosphide; Boron trioxide
- Except where otherwise noted, data are given for materials in their standard state (at 25 °C [77 °F], 100 kPa). verify (what is ?) Infobox references

Boron nitride is a thermally and chemically resistant refractory compound of boron and nitrogen with the chemical formula BN. It exists in various crystalline forms that are isoelectronic to a similarly structured carbon lattice. The hexagonal form corresponding to graphite is the most stable and soft among BN polymorphs, and is therefore used as a lubricant and an additive to cosmetic products. The cubic (zincblende aka sphalerite structure) variety analogous to diamond is called c-BN; it is softer than diamond, but its thermal and chemical stability are superior.

Because of excellent thermal and chemical stability, boron nitride ceramics are used in high-temperature equipment and metal casting. Boron nitride has potential use in nanotechnology.

== History ==
Boron nitride was discovered by chemistry teacher of the Liverpool Institute, William Henry Balmain in 1842 via reduction of boric acid with charcoal in the presence of potassium cyanide. The earliest mention of a patent for the production of boron nitride exists in a 1913 paper on the synthesis of nitrides and ammonia. This patent involved heating charcoal impregnated with boric acid in the presence of nitrogen gas at "bright red heat and elevated temperature," resulting in meagre yields. In 1890, Stähler and Elbert succeeded in obtaining yields of 82-85.5 % at 1600 °C and 50–70 atm (5,100–7,100 kPa). Nitrides of boron, alongside titanium, aluminium, and silicon, were considered as candidates for nitrogen fixation, prior to the large-scale implementation of the Haber-Bosch Process, but it was not until the 1950s that the electrically insulative properties of BN were detailed and the graphite-like hexagonal form (h-BN) was produced on an industrial level by Union Carbide and Carborundum Universal.

In 1957, the cubic form of boron nitride (c-BN) was synthesised by Robert H. Wentworf, Jr., a physical chemist working for General Electric. The polymorph was officially trademarked by the company in 1969 as Borazon, and applied as a more thermally stable abrasive than its structural analogue, diamond.

In 1994, boron nitride nanotubes (BNNTs) were theorised by Marvin Cohen and synthesised by Alex Zettl the following year. Boron nitride has applications in mechanical insulation and pharmaceuticals, while its electronic, thermal, and optical properties make it a candidate for high-power, deep-ultraviolet, and two-dimensional electronics.

It was previously known as æthogen

== Structure ==
Boron nitride exists in multiple forms that differ in the arrangement of the boron and nitrogen atoms, giving rise to varying bulk properties of the material.

=== Amorphous form (a-BN) ===
The amorphous form of boron nitride (a-BN) is non-crystalline, lacking any long-distance regularity in the arrangement of its atoms. It is analogous to amorphous carbon.

All other forms of boron nitride are crystalline.

=== Hexagonal form (h-BN) ===
The most stable crystalline form is the hexagonal one, also called h-BN, α-BN, g-BN, graphitic boron nitride and "white graphite". Hexagonal boron nitride (point group = D_{3h}; space group = P6_{3}/mmc) has a layered structure similar to graphite. Within each layer, boron and nitrogen atoms are bound by strong covalent bonds, whereas the layers are held together by weak van der Waals forces. The interlayer "registry" of these sheets differs, however, from the pattern seen for graphite, because the atoms are eclipsed, with boron atoms lying over and above nitrogen atoms. This registry reflects the local polarity of the B–N bonds, as well as interlayer N-donor/B-acceptor characteristics. Likewise, many metastable forms consisting of differently stacked polytypes exist. Therefore, h-BN and graphite are very close neighbors, and the material can accommodate carbon as a substituent element to form BNCs. BC_{6}N hybrids have been synthesized, where carbon substitutes for some B and N atoms. Hexagonal boron nitride monolayer is analogous to graphene, having a honeycomb lattice structure of nearly the same dimensions. Unlike graphene, which is black and an electrical conductor, h-BN monolayer is white and an insulator. It has been proposed for use as an atomic flat insulating substrate or a tunneling dielectric barrier in 2D electronics.

Studies into the optical properties of h-BN at the few- and mono-layer level have been conducted using specialized techniques like deep ultraviolet (DUV) hyperspectral imaging due to its very wide bandgap. Research at low temperatures revealed that monolayer h-BN exhibits photoluminescence consistent with a direct bandgap semiconductor, with emission observed around 6.1 eV. In contrast to observations in other 2D materials like TMDs, the photoluminescence intensity remains remarkably high in few-layer h-BN, which has been attributed to a high radiative efficiency despite the indirect bandgap nature of bulk h-BN. Complementary AFM investigations, particularly in tapping and Kelvin probe modes, have provided nanoscale insight into surface morphology and potential distribution across mono- and few-layer regions. These AFM-based techniques not only assist in confirming flake thickness and uniformity but also support optoelectronic analyses by correlating topographical and electrical variations with luminescence behavior.

=== Functionalization and heterostructures ===
Modifications of hexagonal boron nitride have led to novel materials like hBNCF, a vertical heterostructure involving graphene and h-BN functionalized with fluorine. This material, synthesized from h-BN via graphitization and fluorination, was found to exhibit room-temperature ferromagnetism. Crucially, magnetic force microscopy (MFM), a specialized mode of atomic force microscopy (AFM), was employed to investigate the magnetic properties at the nanoscale. These MFM studies confirmed the ferromagnetic nature of the hBNCF powder. Furthermore, the MFM analysis provided evidence that the observed magnetism was intrinsic to the hBNCF structure, helping to exclude extrinsic metallic magnetic impurities as the origin. The material was also characterized as a wide band gap semiconductor (~3.89 eV) with potential applications as an MRI contrast agent.

=== Cubic form (c-BN) ===
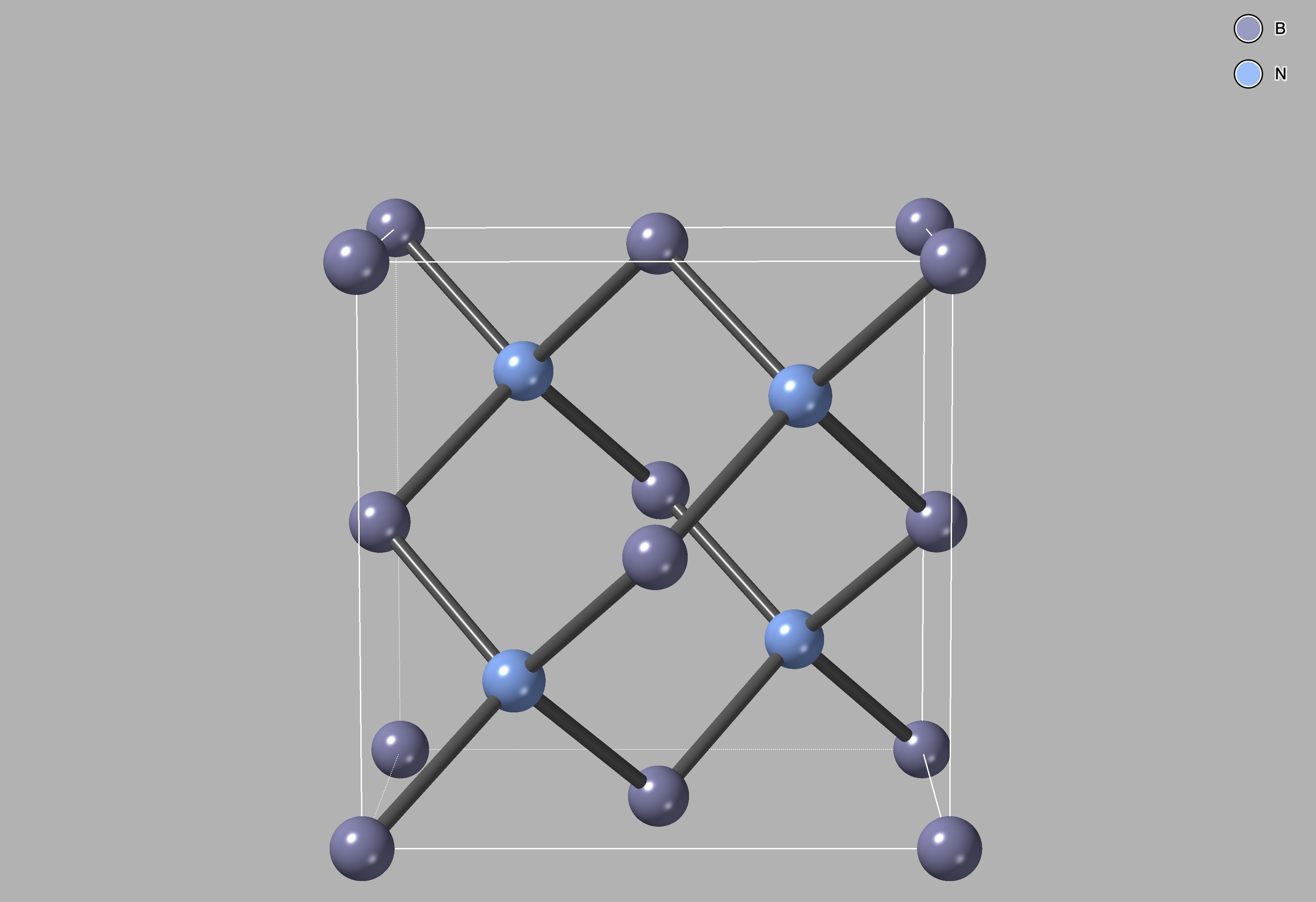
c-BN crystal structure

Cubic boron nitride has a crystal structure analogous to that of diamond. Consistent with diamond being less stable than graphite, the cubic form is less stable than the hexagonal form, but the conversion rate between the two is negligible at room temperature, as it is for diamond. The cubic form has the sphalerite crystal structure (space group = F4̅3m), the same as that of diamond (with ordered B and N atoms), and is also called β-BN or c-BN.

=== Wurtzite form (w-BN) ===
The wurtzite form of boron nitride (w-BN; point group = C_{6v}; space group = P6_{3}mc) has the same structure as lonsdaleite, a rare hexagonal polymorph of carbon. As in the cubic form, the boron and nitrogen atoms are grouped into tetrahedra. In the wurtzite form, the boron and nitrogen atoms are grouped into 6-membered rings. In the cubic form all rings are in the chair configuration, whereas in w-BN the rings between 'layers' are in boat configuration. Earlier optimistic reports predicted that the wurtzite form was very strong, and was estimated by a simulation as potentially having a strength 18% stronger than that of diamond. Since only small amounts of the mineral exist in nature, this has not yet been experimentally verified. Its hardness is 46 GPa, slightly harder than commercial borides but softer than the cubic form of boron nitride.

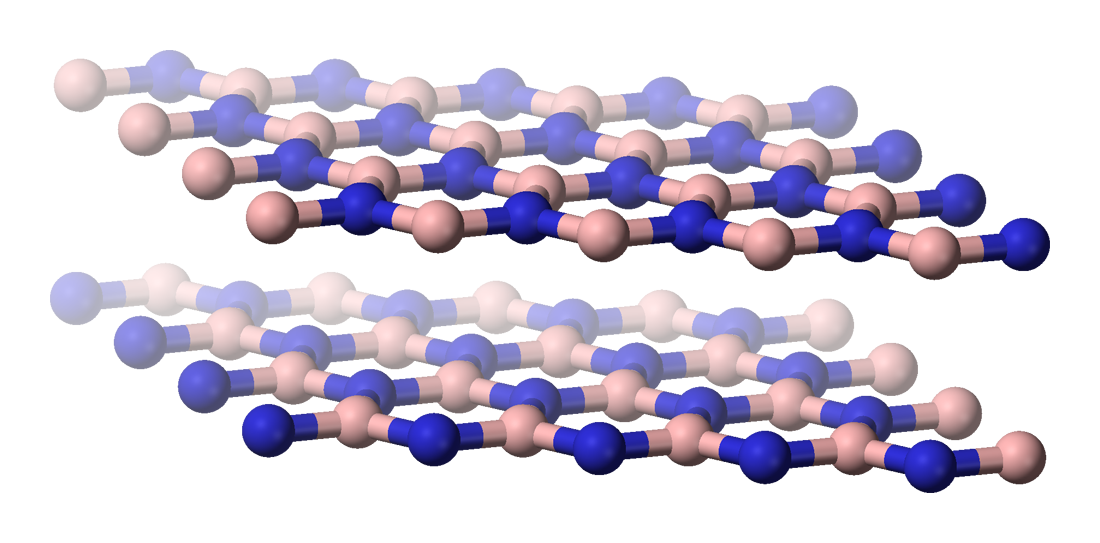
Hexagonal form (h-BN)
hexagonal analogous to graphite

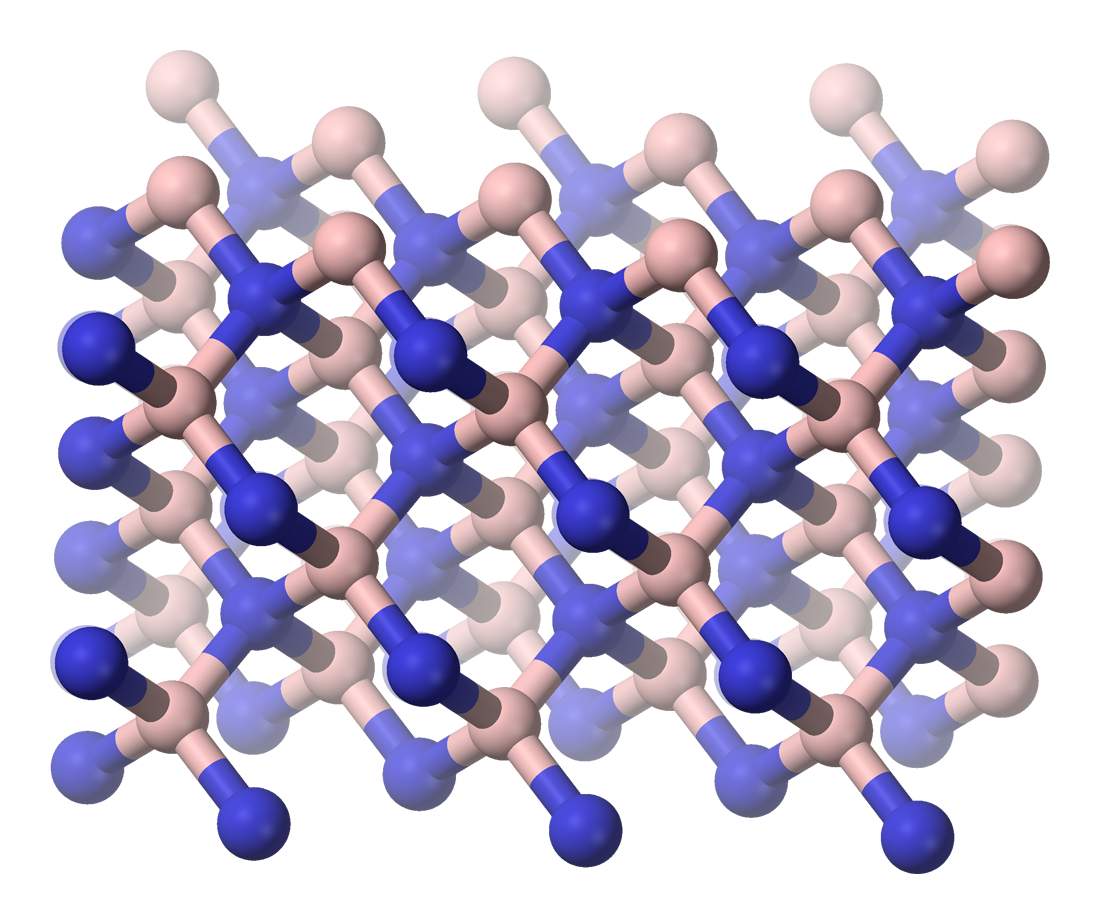
Cubic form (c-BN)
sphalerite structure
analogous to diamond

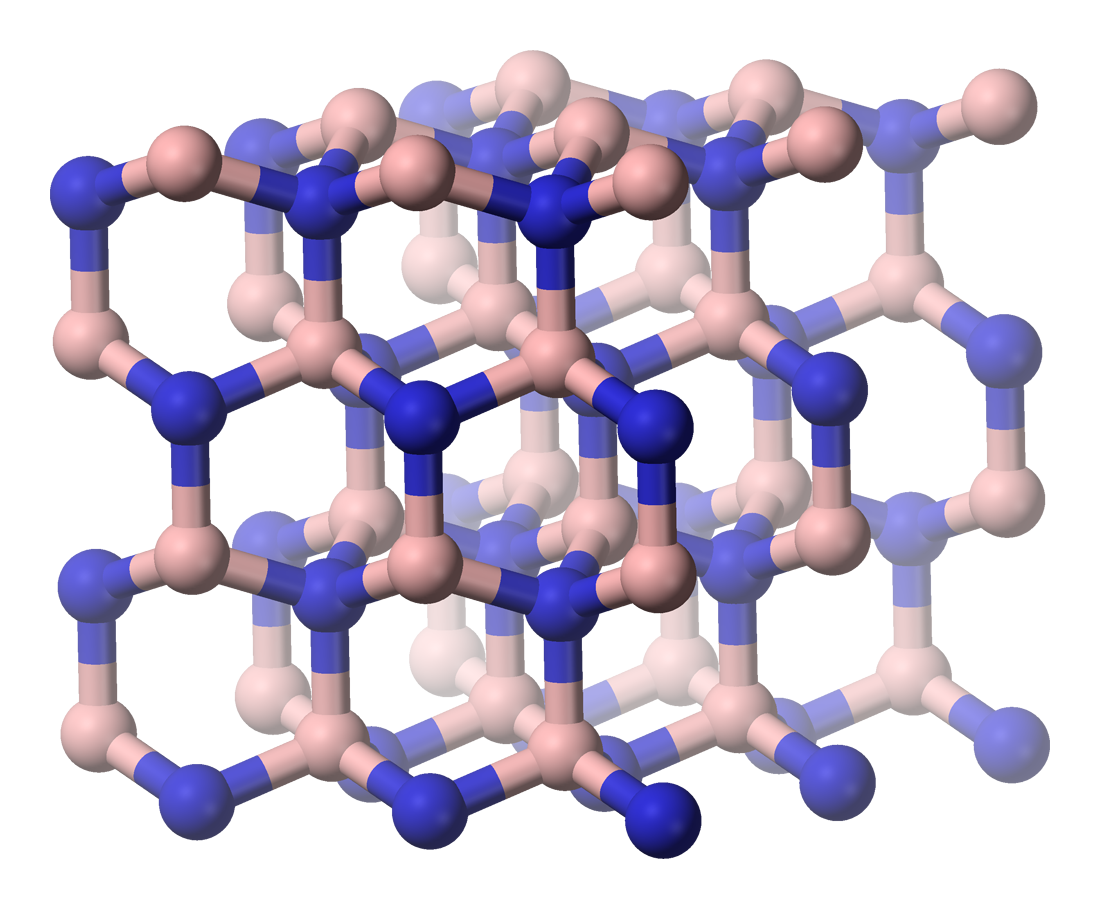
Wurtzite form (w-BN)
wurtzite structure
analogous to lonsdaleite

== Properties ==
=== Physical ===
Properties of amorphous and crystalline BN, graphite and diamond. Some properties of h-BN and graphite differ within the basal planes (∥) and perpendicular to them (⟂)
Material	Boron nitride (BN)				Graphite	Diamond
Material	a-	h-	c-	w-	Graphite	Diamond
Density (g/cm^{3})	2.28	~2.1	3.45	3.49	~2.1	3.515
Knoop hardness (GPa)	10		45	34		100
Bulk modulus (GPa)	100	36.5	400	400	34	440
Thermal conductivity (W/m·K)	3	600 ∥, 30 ⟂	740		200–2000 ∥, 2–800 ⟂	600–2000
Thermal expansion (10^{−6}/K)		−2.7 ∥, 38 ⟂	1.2	2.7	−1.5 ∥, 25 ⟂	0.8
Band gap (eV)	5.05	5.9–6.4	10.1-10.7	4.5–5.5	0	5.5
Refractive index	1.7	1.8	2.1	2.05		2.4
Magnetic susceptibility (µemu/g)		−0.48 ∥, −17.3 ⟂			−0.2 – −2.7 ∥, −20 – −28 ⟂	−1.6

The partly ionic structure of BN layers in h-BN reduces covalency and electrical conductivity, whereas the interlayer interaction increases resulting in higher hardness of h-BN relative to graphite. The reduced electron-delocalization in hexagonal-BN is also indicated by its absence of color and a large band gap. Very different bonding – strong covalent within the basal planes (planes where boron and nitrogen atoms are covalently bonded) and weak between them – causes high anisotropy of most properties of h-BN.

For example, the hardness, electrical and thermal conductivity are much higher within the planes than perpendicular to them. On the contrary, the properties of c-BN and w-BN are more homogeneous and isotropic.

Those materials are extremely hard, with the hardness of bulk c-BN being slightly smaller and w-BN even higher than that of diamond. Polycrystalline c-BN with grain sizes on the order of 10 nm is also reported to have Vickers hardness comparable or higher than diamond. Because of much better stability to heat and transition metals, c-BN surpasses diamond in mechanical applications, such as machining steel. The thermal conductivity of BN is among the highest of all electric insulators (see table).

Boron nitride can be doped p-type with beryllium and n-type with boron, sulfur, silicon or if co-doped with carbon and nitrogen. Both hexagonal and cubic BN are wide-gap semiconductors with a band-gap energy corresponding to the UV region. If voltage is applied to h-BN or c-BN, then it emits UV light in the range 215–250 nm and therefore can potentially be used as light-emitting diodes (LEDs) or lasers.

Little is known of the melting behavior of boron nitride. It degrades at 2973 °C, but melts at elevated pressure.

=== Thermal stability ===
Hexagonal and cubic BN (and probably w-BN) show remarkable chemical and thermal stabilities. For example, h-BN is stable to decomposition at temperatures up to 1000 °C in air, 1400 °C in vacuum, and 2800 °C in an inert atmosphere. The reactivity of h-BN and c-BN is relatively similar, and the data for c-BN are summarized in the table below.

Reactivity of c-BN with solids
Solid	Ambient	Action	Threshold temperature (°C)
Mo	10^{−2} Pa vacuum	Reaction	1360
Ni	10^{−2} Pa vacuum	Wetting (Note: Here wetting refers to the ability of a molten metal to keep contact with solid BN)	1360
Fe, Ni, Co	Argon	React	1400–1500
Al	10^{−2} Pa vacuum	Wetting and reaction	1050
Si	10^{−3} Pa vacuum	Wetting	1500
Cu, Ag, Au, Ga, In, Ge, Sn	10^{−3} Pa vacuum	No wetting	1100
B		No wetting	2200
Al_{2}O_{3} + B_{2}O_{3}	10^{−2} Pa vacuum	No reaction	1360

Thermal stability of c-BN can be summarized as follows:

- In air or oxygen: B_{2}O_{3} protective layer prevents further oxidation to ~1300 °C; no conversion to hexagonal form at 1400 °C.
- In nitrogen: some conversion to h-BN at 1525 °C after 12 h.
- In vacuum (10^{−5} Pa): conversion to h-BN at 1550–1600 °C.

=== Chemical stability ===
Boron nitride is not attacked by the usual acids, but it is soluble in alkaline molten salts and nitrides, such as LiOH, KOH, NaOH-Na_{2}CO_{3}, NaNO_{3}, Li_{3}N, Mg_{3}N_{2}, Sr_{3}N_{2}, Ba_{3}N_{2} or Li_{3}BN_{2}, which are therefore used to etch BN.

=== Thermal conductivity ===
The theoretical thermal conductivity of hexagonal boron nitride nanoribbons (BNNRs) can approach 1700–2000 W/(m⋅K), which has the same order of magnitude as the experimental measured value for graphene, and can be comparable to the theoretical calculations for graphene nanoribbons. Moreover, the thermal transport in the BNNRs is anisotropic. The thermal conductivity of zigzag-edged BNNRs is about 20% larger than that of armchair-edged nanoribbons at room temperature.

=== Mechanical properties ===
BN nanosheets consist of hexagonal boron nitride (h-BN). They are stable up to 800 °C in air. The structure of monolayer BN is similar to that of graphene, which has exceptional strength, a high-temperature lubricant, and a substrate in electronic devices.

The anisotropy of Young's modulus and Poisson's ratio depends on the system size. h-BN also exhibits strongly anisotropic strength and toughness, and maintains these over a range of vacancy defects, showing that the anisotropy is independent to the defect type.

== Natural occurrence ==
In 2009, cubic form (c-BN) was reported in Tibet, and the name qingsongite proposed. The substance was found in dispersed micron-sized inclusions in chromium-rich rocks. In 2013, the International Mineralogical Association affirmed the mineral and the name.

== Synthesis ==
=== Preparation and reactivity of hexagonal BN ===
Hexagonal boron nitride is obtained by the treating boron trioxide (B_{2}O_{3}) or boric acid (H_{3}BO_{3}) with ammonia (NH_{3}) or urea (CO(NH_{2})_{2}) in an inert atmosphere:

B_{2}O_{3} + 2 NH_{3} → 2 BN + 3 H_{2}O (T = 900 °C)
B(OH)_{3} + NH_{3} → BN + 3 H_{2}O (T = 900 °C)
B_{2}O_{3} + CO(NH_{2})_{2} → 2 BN + CO_{2} + 2 H_{2}O (T > 1000 °C)
B_{2}O_{3} + 3 CaB_{6} + 10 N_{2} → 20 BN + 3 CaO (T > 1500 °C)

The resulting disordered (amorphous) material contains 92–95% BN and 5–8% B_{2}O_{3}. The remaining B_{2}O_{3} can be evaporated in a second step at temperatures > 1500 °C in order to achieve BN concentration >98%. Such annealing also crystallizes BN, the size of the crystallites increasing with the annealing temperature.

h-BN parts can be fabricated inexpensively by hot-pressing with subsequent machining. The parts are made from boron nitride powders adding boron oxide for better compressibility. Thin films of boron nitride can be obtained by chemical vapor deposition from borazine. ZYP Coatings also has developed boron nitride coatings that may be painted on a surface. Combustion of boron powder in nitrogen plasma at 5500 °C yields ultrafine boron nitride used for lubricants and toners.

Boron nitride reacts with iodine fluoride to give NI_{3} in low yield. Boron nitride reacts with nitrides of lithium, alkaline earth metals and lanthanides to form nitridoborates. For example:

Li_{3}N + BN → Li_{3}BN_{2}

=== Intercalation of hexagonal BN ===
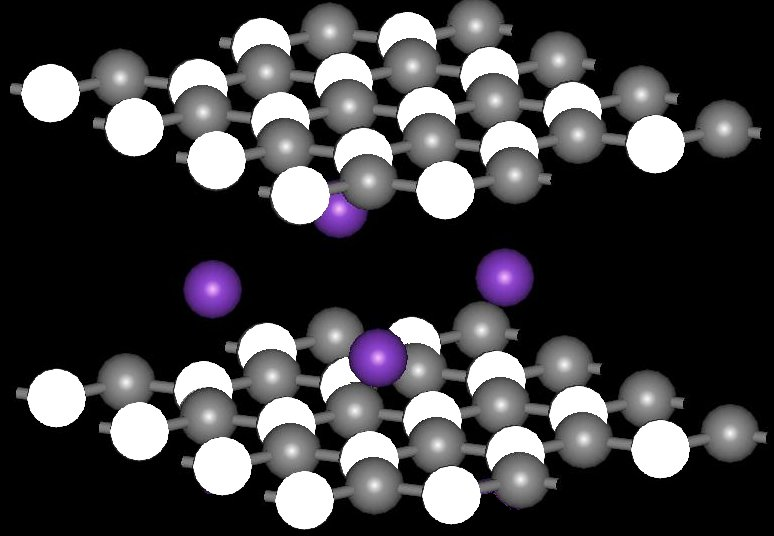
Structure of hexagonal boron nitride intercalated with potassium (B_{4}N_{4}K)

Various species intercalate into hexagonal BN, such as NH_{3} intercalate or alkali metals.

=== Preparation of cubic BN ===
c-BN is prepared analogously to the preparation of synthetic diamond from graphite. Direct conversion of hexagonal boron nitride to the cubic form has been observed at pressures between 5 and 18 GPa and temperatures between 1730 and 3230 °C, that is similar parameters as for direct graphite-diamond conversion. The addition of a small amount of boron oxide can lower the required pressure to 4–7 GPa and temperature to 1500 °C. As in diamond synthesis, to further reduce the conversion pressures and temperatures, a catalyst is added, such as lithium, potassium, or magnesium, their nitrides, their fluoronitrides, water with ammonium compounds, or hydrazine. Other industrial synthesis methods, again borrowed from diamond growth, use crystal growth in a temperature gradient, or explosive shock wave. The shock wave method is used to produce material called heterodiamond, a superhard compound of boron, carbon, and nitrogen.

Low-pressure deposition of thin films of cubic boron nitride is possible. As in diamond growth, the major problem is to suppress the growth of hexagonal phases (h-BN or graphite, respectively). Whereas in diamond growth this is achieved by adding hydrogen gas, boron trifluoride is used for c-BN. Ion beam deposition, plasma-enhanced chemical vapor deposition, pulsed laser deposition, reactive sputtering, and other physical vapor deposition methods are used as well.

=== Preparation of wurtzite BN ===
Wurtzite BN can be obtained via static high-pressure or dynamic shock methods. The limits of its stability are not well defined. When pressure is decreased to atmospheric pressure, w-BN produced by conversion of h-BN at high pressures have shown the tendency to recover back to h-BN. However, it has been found that 3D networks of planar defects, constructed by high densities of intrinsic stacking faults and inversion domain boundaries, facilitated the stability of millimeter-size w-BN crystals at atmospheric pressure. Both c-BN and w-BN are formed by compressing h-BN, but formation of w-BN occurs at much lower temperatures close to 1700 °C.

=== Production statistics ===
Whereas the production and consumption figures for the raw materials used for BN synthesis, namely boric acid and boron trioxide, are well known (see boron), the corresponding numbers for the boron nitride are not listed in statistical reports. An estimate for the 1999 world production is 300 to 350 metric tons. The major producers and consumers of BN are located in the United States, Japan, China and Germany. In 2000, prices varied from about $75–120/kg for standard industrial-quality h-BN and were about up to $200–400/kg for high purity BN grades.

== Applications ==
=== Hexagonal BN ===
Ceramic BN crucible

Hexagonal BN (h-BN) is the most widely used polymorph. It is a good lubricant at both low and high temperatures (up to 900 °C, even in an oxidizing atmosphere). h-BN lubricant is particularly useful when the electrical conductivity or chemical reactivity of graphite (alternative lubricant) would be problematic. In internal combustion engines, where graphite could be oxidized and turn into carbon sludge, h-BN with its superior thermal stability can be added to engine lubricants. As with all nano-particle suspensions, Brownian-motion settlement is a problem. Settlement can clog engine oil filters, which limits solid lubricant applications in a combustion engine to automotive racing, where engine re-building is common. Since carbon has appreciable solubility in certain alloys (such as steels), which may lead to degradation of properties, BN is often superior for high temperature and/or high pressure applications. Another advantage of h-BN over graphite is that its lubricity does not require water or gas molecules trapped between the layers. Therefore, h-BN lubricants can be used in vacuum, such as space applications. The lubricating properties of fine-grained h-BN are used in cosmetics, paints, dental cements, and pencil leads.

Hexagonal BN was first used in cosmetics around 1940 in Japan. Because of its high price, h-BN was abandoned for this application. Its use was revitalized in the late 1990s with the optimization h-BN production processes, and currently h-BN is used by nearly all leading producers of cosmetic products for foundations, make-up, eye shadows, blushers, kohl pencils, lipsticks and other skincare products.

Because of its excellent thermal and chemical stability, boron nitride ceramics and coatings are used high-temperature equipment. h-BN can be included in ceramics, alloys, resins, plastics, rubbers, and other materials, giving them self-lubricating properties. Such materials are suitable for construction of e.g. bearings and in steelmaking. Many quantum devices use multilayer h-BN as a substrate material. It can also be used as a dielectric in resistive random access memories.

Hexagonal BN is used in xerographic process and laser printers as a charge leakage barrier layer of the photo drum. In the automotive industry, h-BN mixed with a binder (boron oxide) is used for sealing oxygen sensors, which provide feedback for adjusting fuel flow. The binder utilizes the unique temperature stability and insulating properties of h-BN.

Hexagonal boron nitride powders can be consolidated into shapes by hot pressing. The chemical and physical properties of the resulting ceramics depend on the type and amount of densification additives. Thermal conductivity, thermal expansion and mechanical properties can also vary with direction because hot pressing can produce a preferred orientation of the BN grains.

Boron nitride nanosheets (h-BN) can be deposited by catalytic decomposition of borazine at a temperature ~1100 °C in a chemical vapor deposition setup, over areas up to about 10 cm^{2}. Owing to their hexagonal atomic structure, small lattice mismatch with graphene (~2%), and high uniformity they are used as substrates for graphene-based devices. BN nanosheets are also excellent proton conductors. Their high proton transport rate, combined with the high electrical resistance, may lead to applications in fuel cells and water electrolysis.

h-BN has been used since the mid-2000s as a bullet and bore lubricant in precision target rifle applications as an alternative to molybdenum disulfide coating, commonly referred to as "moly". It is claimed to increase effective barrel life, increase intervals between bore cleaning and decrease the deviation in point of impact between clean bore first shots and subsequent shots.

h-BN is used as a release agent in molten metal and glass applications. For example, ZYP Coatings developed and currently produces a line of paintable h-BN coatings that are used by manufacturers of molten aluminium, non-ferrous metal, and glass. Because h-BN is nonwetting and lubricious to these molten materials, the coated surface (i.e. mold or crucible) does not stick to the material.

Exfoliated h-BN shows the ability to improved mechanical and thermal properties of polypropylene. One process used Resonant Acoustic Mixing to coat polypropylene with the h-BN. Then the h-BN was exfoliated by running the material through a high-pressure homogenizer, effectively creating nanosheets. This melt process also caused the h-BN to have a more uniform distribution through the polypropylene. Improvements were especially noted in oxidative thermal stability, enhanced oxidative induction time and reduct carbonyl index values.

=== Cubic BN ===
Cubic boron nitride (CBN or c-BN) is widely used as an abrasive. Its usefulness arises from its insolubility in iron, nickel, and related alloys at high temperatures, whereas diamond is soluble in these metals. Polycrystalline c-BN (PCBN) abrasives are therefore used for machining steel, whereas diamond abrasives are preferred for aluminum alloys, ceramics, and stone. When in contact with oxygen at high temperatures, BN forms a passivation layer of boron oxide. Boron nitride binds well with metals due to formation of interlayers of metal borides or nitrides. Materials with cubic boron nitride crystals are often used in the tool bits of cutting tools. For grinding applications, softer binders such as resin, porous ceramics and soft metals are used. Ceramic binders can be used as well. Commercial products are known under names "Borazon" (by Hyperion Materials & Technologies), and "Elbor" or "Cubonite" (by Russian vendors).

Contrary to diamond, large c-BN pellets can be produced in a simple process (called sintering) of annealing c-BN powders in nitrogen flow at temperatures slightly below the BN decomposition temperature. This ability of c-BN and h-BN powders to fuse allows cheap production of large BN parts.

Similar to diamond, the combination in c-BN of highest thermal conductivity and electrical resistivity is ideal for heat spreaders.

As cubic boron nitride consists of light atoms and is very robust chemically and mechanically, it is one of the popular materials for X-ray membranes: low mass results in small X-ray absorption, and good mechanical properties allow usage of thin membranes, further reducing the absorption.

=== Amorphous BN ===
Layers of amorphous boron nitride (a-BN) are used in some semiconductor devices, e.g. MOSFETs. They can be prepared by chemical decomposition of trichloroborazine with caesium, or by thermal chemical vapor deposition methods. Thermal CVD can be also used for deposition of h-BN layers, or at high temperatures, c-BN.

== Other forms of boron nitride ==
=== Atomically thin boron nitride ===
Hexagonal boron nitride can be exfoliated to mono or few atomic layer sheets. Due to its analogous structure to that of graphene, atomically thin boron nitride is sometimes called white graphene.

==== Mechanical properties ====
Atomically thin boron nitride is one of the strongest electrically insulating materials. Monolayer boron nitride has an average Young's modulus of 0.865TPa and fracture strength of 70.5GPa, and in contrast to graphene, whose strength decreases dramatically with increased thickness, few-layer boron nitride sheets have a strength similar to that of monolayer boron nitride.

==== Thermal conductivity ====
Atomically thin boron nitride has one of the highest thermal conductivity coefficients (751 W/mK at room temperature) among semiconductors and electrical insulators, and its thermal conductivity increases with reduced thickness due to less intra-layer coupling.

==== Thermal stability ====
The air stability of graphene shows a clear thickness dependence: monolayer graphene is reactive to oxygen at 250 °C, strongly doped at 300 °C, and etched at 450 °C; in contrast, bulk graphite is not oxidized until 800 °C. Atomically thin boron nitride has much better oxidation resistance than graphene. Monolayer boron nitride is not oxidized till 700 °C and can sustain up to 850 °C in air; bilayer and trilayer boron nitride nanosheets have slightly higher oxidation starting temperatures. The excellent thermal stability, high impermeability to gas and liquid, and electrical insulation make atomically thin boron nitride potential coating materials for preventing surface oxidation and corrosion of metals and other two-dimensional (2D) materials, such as black phosphorus.

==== Better surface adsorption ====
Atomically thin boron nitride has been found to have better surface adsorption capabilities than bulk hexagonal boron nitride. According to theoretical and experimental studies, atomically thin boron nitride as an adsorbent experiences conformational changes upon surface adsorption of molecules, increasing adsorption energy and efficiency. The synergic effect of the atomic thickness, high flexibility, stronger surface adsorption capability, electrical insulation, impermeability, high thermal and chemical stability of BN nanosheets can increase the Raman sensitivity by up to two orders, and in the meantime attain long-term stability and reusability not readily achievable by other materials.

==== Dielectric properties ====
Atomically thin hexagonal boron nitride is an excellent dielectric substrate for graphene, molybdenum disulfide (MoS_{2}), and many other 2D material-based electronic and photonic devices. As shown by electric force microscopy (EFM) studies, the electric field screening in atomically thin boron nitride shows a weak dependence on thickness, which is in line with the smooth decay of electric field inside few-layer boron nitride revealed by the first-principles calculations.

==== Raman characteristics ====
Raman spectroscopy has been a useful tool to study a variety of 2D materials, and the Raman signature of high-quality atomically thin boron nitride was first reported by Gorbachev et al. in 2011. and Li et al. However, the two reported Raman results of monolayer boron nitride did not agree with each other. Cai et al., therefore, conducted systematic experimental and theoretical studies to reveal the intrinsic Raman spectrum of atomically thin boron nitride. It reveals that atomically thin boron nitride without interaction with a substrate has a G band frequency similar to that of bulk hexagonal boron nitride, but strain induced by the substrate can cause Raman shifts. Nevertheless, the Raman intensity of G band of atomically thin boron nitride can be used to estimate layer thickness and sample quality.

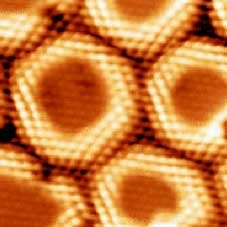
BN nanomesh observed with a scanning tunneling microscope. The center of each ring corresponds to the center of the pores

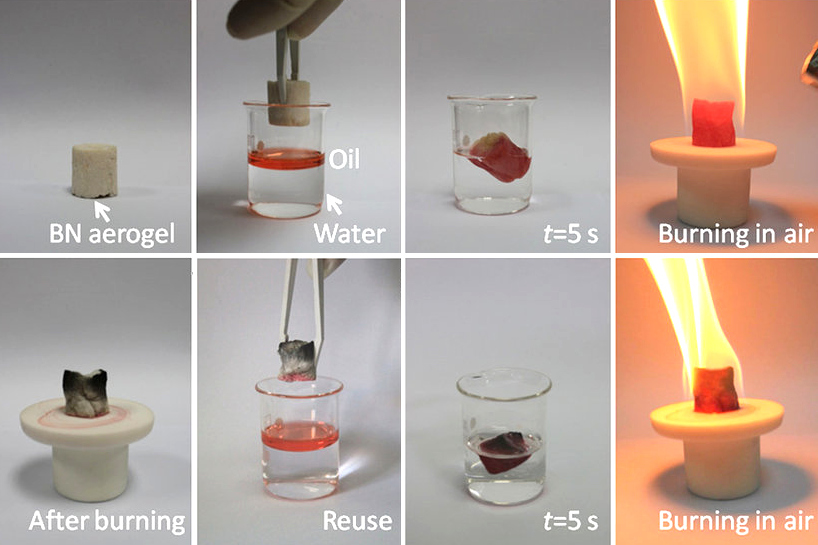
Top: absorption of cyclohexane by BN aerogel. Cyclohexane is stained with Sudan II red dye and is floating on water. Bottom: reuse of the aerogel after burning in air.

=== Boron nitride nanomesh ===
Boron nitride nanomesh is a nanostructured two-dimensional material. It consists of a single BN layer, which forms by self-assembly a highly regular mesh after high-temperature exposure of a clean rhodium or ruthenium surface to borazine under ultra-high vacuum. The nanomesh looks like an assembly of hexagonal pores. The distance between two pore centers is 3.2 nm and the pore diameter is ~2 nm. Other terms for this material are boronitrene or white graphene.

The boron nitride nanomesh is air-stable and compatible with some liquids. up to temperatures of 800 °C.

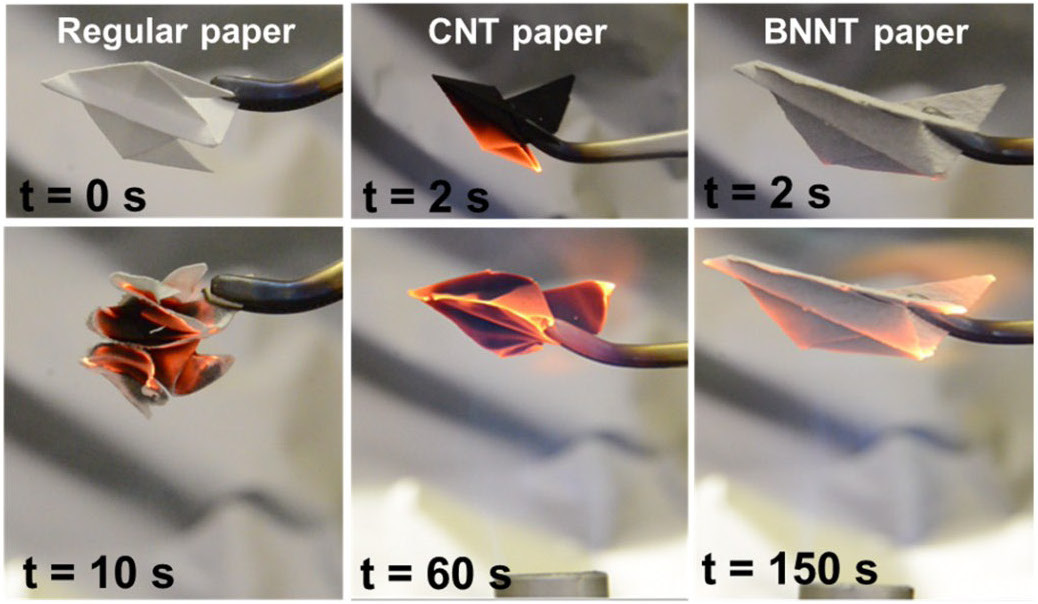
BN nanotubes are flame resistant, as shown in this comparative test of airplanes made of cellulose, carbon buckypaper and BN nanotube buckypaper.

=== Boron nitride nanotubes ===
Boron nitride tubules were first made in 1989 by Shore and Dolan. This work was patented in 1989 and published in 1989 thesis (Dolan) and then 1993 Science. The 1989 work was also the first preparation of amorphous BN by B-trichloroborazine and cesium metal.

Boron nitride nanotubes were predicted in 1994 and experimentally discovered in 1995. They can be imagined as a rolled up sheet of h-boron nitride. Structurally, it is a close analog of the carbon nanotube, namely a long cylinder with diameter of several to hundred nanometers and length of many micrometers, except carbon atoms are alternately substituted by nitrogen and boron atoms. However, the properties of BN nanotubes are very different: whereas carbon nanotubes can be metallic or semiconducting depending on the rolling direction and radius, a BN nanotube is an electrical insulator with a bandgap of ~5.5 eV, basically independent of tube chirality and morphology. In addition, a layered BN structure is much more thermally and chemically stable than a graphitic carbon structure.

=== Boron nitride aerogel ===
Boron nitride aerogel is an aerogel made of highly porous BN. It typically consists of a mixture of deformed BN nanotubes and nanosheets. It can have a density as low as 0.6 mg/cm^{3} and a specific surface area as high as 1050 m^{2}/g, and therefore has potential applications as an absorbent, catalyst support and gas storage medium. BN aerogels are highly hydrophobic and can absorb up to 160 times their weight in oil. They are resistant to oxidation in air at temperatures up to 1200 °C, and hence can be reused after the absorbed oil is burned out by flame. BN aerogels can be prepared by template-assisted chemical vapor deposition using borazine as the feed gas.

=== Composites containing BN ===
Addition of boron nitride to silicon nitride ceramics improves the thermal shock resistance of the resulting material. For the same purpose, BN is added also to silicon nitride-alumina and titanium nitride-alumina ceramics. Other materials being reinforced with BN include alumina and zirconia, borosilicate glasses, glass ceramics, enamels, and composite ceramics with titanium boride-boron nitride, titanium boride-aluminium nitride-boron nitride, and silicon carbide-boron nitride composition.

Zirconia Stabilized Boron Nitride (ZSBN) is produced by adding zirconia to BN, enhancing its thermal shock resistance and mechanical strength through a sintering process. It offers better performance characteristics including Superior corrosion and erosion resistance over a wide temperature range. Its unique combination of thermal conductivity, lubricity, mechanical strength, and stability makes it suitable for various applications including cutting tools and wear-resistant coatings, thermal and electrical insulation, aerospace and defense, and high-temperature components.

=== Pyrolytic boron nitride (PBN) ===
Pyrolytic boron nitride (PBN) is a form of boron nitride produced by chemical vapor deposition (CVD).Pyrolytic boron nitride is typically prepared through the thermal decomposition of boron trichloride and ammonia vapors on graphite substrates at 1900 °C.

Pyrolytic boron nitride (PBN) generally has a hexagonal structure similar to hexagonal boron nitride (hBN), though it can exhibit stacking faults or deviations from the ideal lattice. Properties relevant to semiconductor materials processing include purity, chemical and thermal stability, and anisotropic thermal and mechanical behavior. PBN containers are used for crystal growth and metal evaporation.

Due to a highly ordered planar texture similar to pyrolytic graphite (PG), it exhibits anisotropic properties such as lower dielectric constant vertical to the crystal plane and higher bending strength along the crystal plane. PBN material has been widely manufactured as crucibles of compound semiconductor crystals, output windows and dielectric rods of traveling-wave tubes, high-temperature jigs and insulator.

== Health issues ==
Boron nitride (along with Si_{3}N_{4}, NbN, and BNC) is generally considered to be non-toxic and does not exhibit chemical activity in biological systems. Due to its excellent safety profile and lubricious properties, boron nitride finds widespread use in various applications, including cosmetics and food processing equipment. However, although boron nitride is safe in bulk amounts, when it is introduced to the body in nanotube form, it can cause serious lung inflammation and cellular damage.

However, research on hexagonal boron nitride nanosheets suggests that their toxicological profile differs from that of nanotubes. The two-dimensional form is generally considered to have a safer profile at the pulmonary level compared to high-aspect-ratio nanotubes, and studies on skin models have found it to be non-irritant.

== See also ==
- Beta-carbon nitride
- Borazon
- Borocarbonitrides
- Boron suboxide
- Superhard materials
- Wide-bandgap semiconductors
