= Boron phosphide =

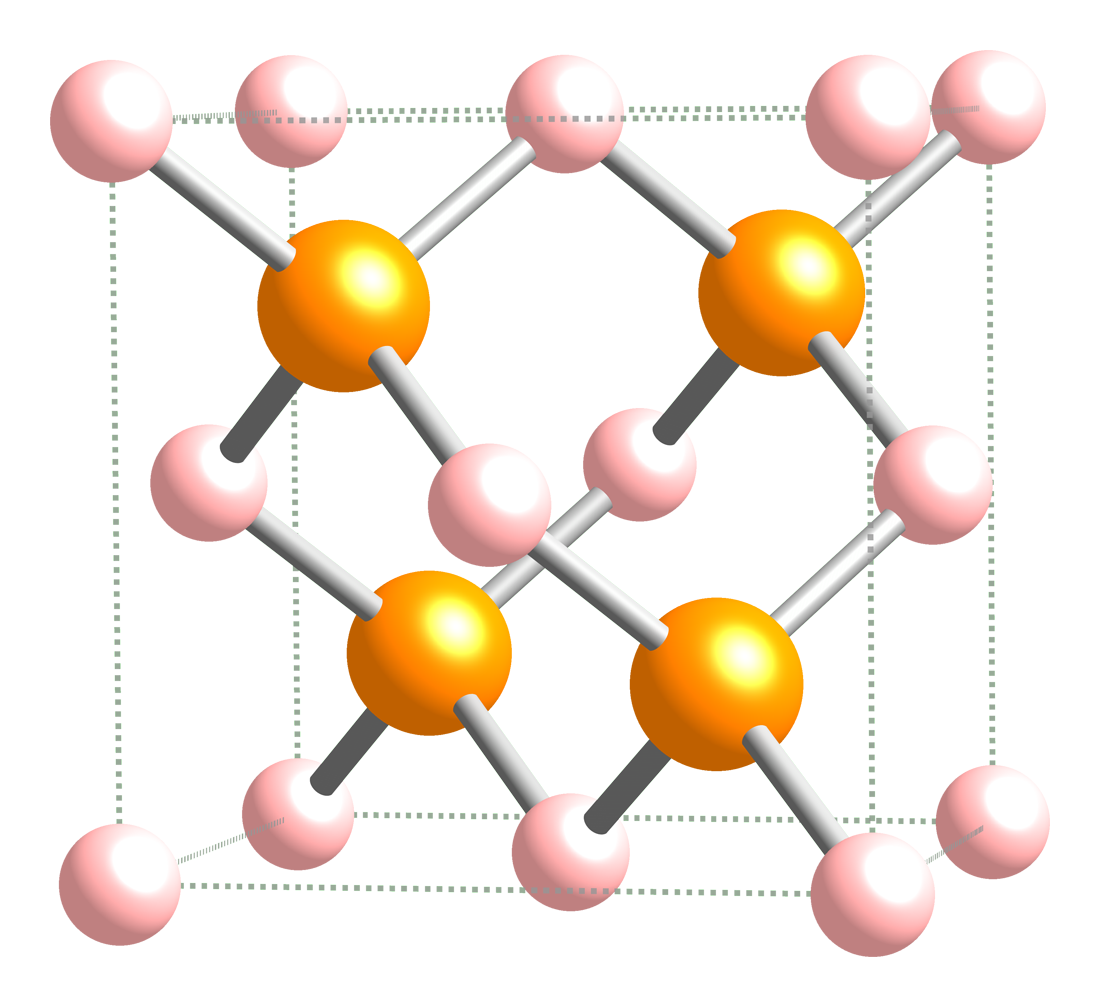

Identifiers
CAS Number	20205-91-8
3D model (JSmol)	Interactive image; Interactive image
ChemSpider	79763
ECHA InfoCard	100.039.616
EC Number	243-593-3
PubChem CID	88409
CompTox Dashboard (EPA)	DTXSID1066570
- InChI: InChI=1S/BP/c1-2 Key: FFBGYFUYJVKRNV-UHFFFAOYSA-N
- SMILES: [B+3].[P-3]; B#P

Properties
Chemical formula	BP
Molar mass	41.7855 g/mol
Appearance	maroon powder
Density	2.90 g/cm^{3}
Melting point	1,100 °C (2,010 °F; 1,370 K) (decomposes)
Band gap	2.1 eV (indirect, 300 K)
Thermal conductivity	4.6 W/(cm·K) (300 K)
Refractive index (n_{D})	3.0 (0.63 μm)

Structure
Crystal structure	Zinc blende
Space group	F4̅3m
Coordination geometry	Tetrahedral
- Except where otherwise noted, data are given for materials in their standard state (at 25 °C [77 °F], 100 kPa). verify (what is ?) Infobox references

Boron phosphide (BP) (also referred to as boron monophosphide, to distinguish it from boron subphosphide, B_{12}P_{2}) is a chemical compound of boron and phosphorus. It is a semiconductor.

== History ==
Crystals of boron phosphide were synthesized by Henri Moissan as early as 1891.

== Appearance ==
Pure BP is almost transparent, n-type crystals are orange-red whereas p-type ones are dark red.

== Chemical properties ==
BP is not attacked by acids or boiling aqueous alkali water solutions. It is only attacked by molten alkalis.

== Physical properties ==
BP is known to be chemically inert and exhibit very high thermal conductivity. Some properties of BP are listed below:

- lattice constant 0.45383 nm
- coefficient of thermal expansion 3.65×10^{−6} /°C (400 K)
- heat capacity C_{P} ~ 0.8 J/(g·K) (300 K)
- Debye temperature = 985 K
- Bulk modulus 152 GPa
- relatively high microhardness of 32 GPa (100 g load).
- electron and hole mobilities of a few hundred cm^{2}/(V·s) (up to 500 for holes at 300 K)
- high thermal conductivity of ~ 460 W/(m·K) at room temperature

== See also ==
- Boron arsenide
- Boron nitride
- Aluminium phosphide
- Gallium phosphide
