= Borocarbonitrides =

Class of chemical compounds

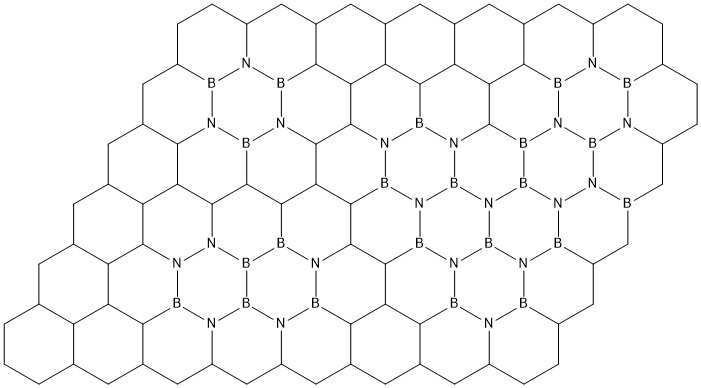
A schematic of borocarbonitride (BCN)

Borocarbonitrides are two-dimensional compounds that contain boron, nitrogen, and carbon atoms in a ratio BxCyNz. Borocarbonitrides are distinct from B,N co-doped graphene in that the former contains separate boron nitride and graphene domains as well as rings with B-C, B-N, C-N, and C-C bonds. These compounds generally have a high surface area, but borocarbonitrides synthesized from a high surface area carbon material, urea, and boric acid tend to have the highest surface areas. This high surface area coupled with the presence of Stone–Wales defects in the structure of borocarbonitrides also allows for high absorption of CO_{2} and CH_{4,} which may make borocarbonitride compounds a useful material in sequestering these gases_{.}

== Electrical ==
The band gap of borocarbonitrides range from 1.0–3.9eV and is dependent on the content of the carbon and boron nitride domains as they have different electrical properties. Borocarbonitrides with a high carbon content have lower bandgaps whereas those with higher content of boron nitride domains have higher band gaps. Borocarbonitrides synthesized in gas or solid reactions also tend to have large bandgaps and are more insulating in character. The wide range of composition of boronitrides allows for the tuning of the bandgap, which when coupled with its high surface area and Stone–Wales defects may make boronitrides a promising material in electrical devices.

== Synthesis ==
=== Solid state reaction ===
A high surface area carbon material such as activated charcoal, boric acid, and urea are mixed together and then heated at high temperatures to synthesize borocarbonitride. The composition of the resulting compounds may be changed by varying the concentration of the reagents as well as the temperature.

=== Gas phase synthesis ===
In chemical vapor deposition, boron, nitrogen, and carbon precursors react at high heat and are deposited onto a metal substrate. Varying the concentration of precursors and the selection of certain precursors will give different ratios of boron, nitrogen, and carbon in the resulting borocarbonitride compound.

=== Borocarbonitride composites ===
Borocarbonitride can also be synthesized by random stacking of boronitride and graphene domains through covalent interactions or through liquid interactions. In the first method, graphene and boron nitride sheets are functionalized and then are reacted to form layers of borocarbonitride. In the second method, boron nitride and graphite powder are dissolved in isopropanol and dimethylformamide, respectively, and then sonicated. This is then exfoliated to isolate borocarbonitride layers.
