= Boron nitride nanotube =

Polymorph of boron nitride

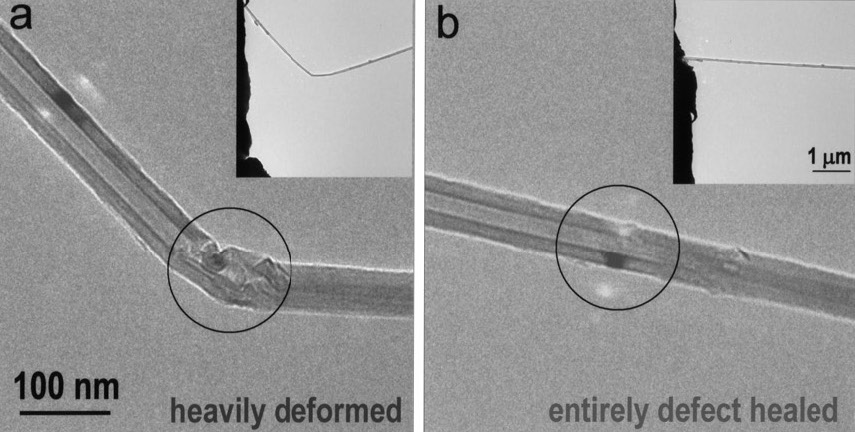
BN nanotube was bent inside a transmission electron microscope. Its walls self-healed after release of pressure.

Boron nitride nanotubes (BNNTs) are a polymorph of boron nitride. They were predicted in 1994 and experimentally discovered in 1995. Structurally they are similar to carbon nanotubes, which are cylinders with sub-micrometer diameters and micrometer lengths, except that carbon atoms are alternately substituted by nitrogen and boron atoms. However, the properties of BN nanotubes are very different: whereas carbon nanotubes can be metallic or semiconducting depending on the rolling direction and radius, a BN nanotube is an electrical insulator with a bandgap of ~5.5 eV, basically independent of tube chirality and morphology. In addition, a layered BN structure is much more thermally and chemically stable than a graphitic carbon structure. BNNTs have unique physical and chemical properties, when compared to Carbon Nanotubes (CNTs) providing a very wide range of commercial and scientific applications. Although BNNTs and CNTs share similar tensile strength properties of circa 100 times stronger than steel and 50 times stronger than industrial-grade carbon fibre, BNNTs can withstand high temperatures of up to 900 °C. as opposed to CNTs which remain stable up to temperatures of 400 °C, and are also capable of absorbing radiation. BNNTS are packed with physicochemical features including high hydrophobicity and considerable hydrogen storage capacity and they are being investigated for possible medical and biomedical applications, including gene delivery, drug delivery, neutron capture therapy, and more generally as biomaterials BNNTs are also superior to CNTs in the way they bond to polymers giving rise to many new applications and composite materials.

== Synthesis and production ==
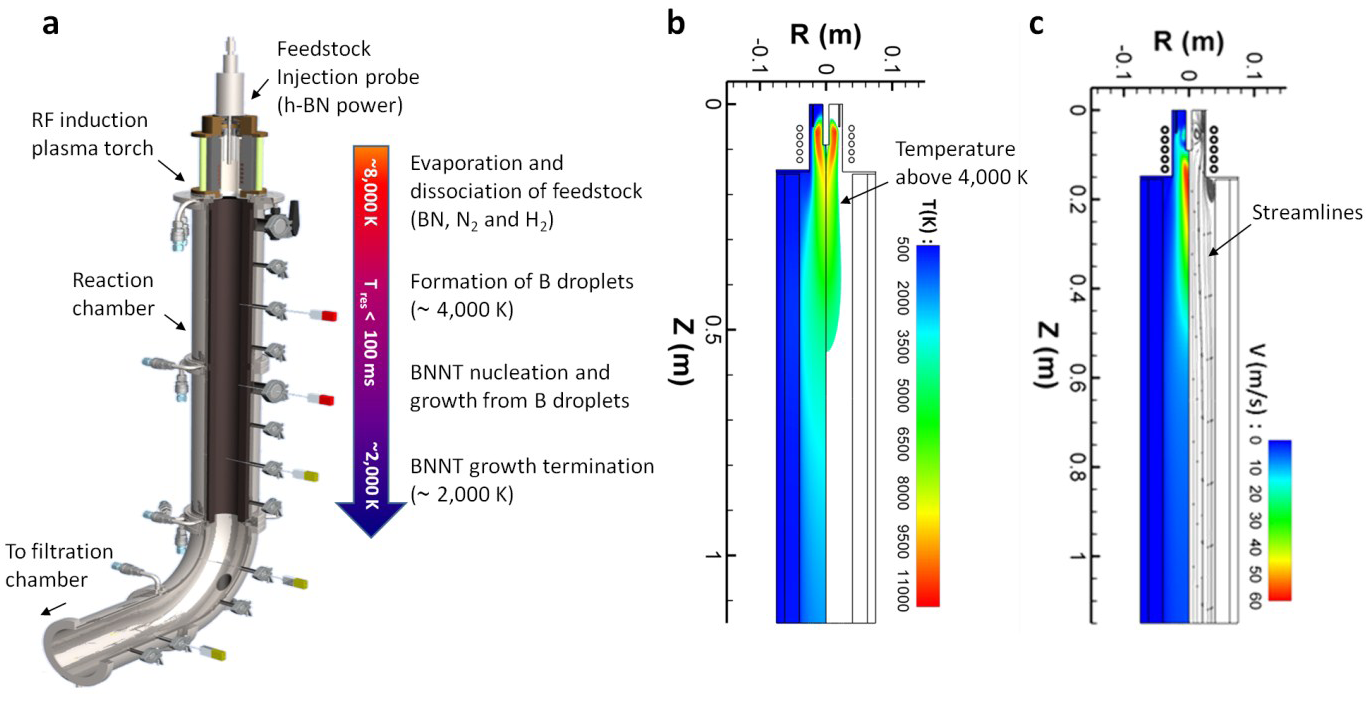
(a) Schematic of an RF induction thermal plasma system used for mass production of BNNTs. Pure h-BN powder is continuously transformed into BNNTs by passing through a high-temperature N_{2}-H_{2} plasma (~8000 K). (b) Calculated temperature distribution inside the reactor. (c) Calculated velocity distribution (left) and streamlines (right).

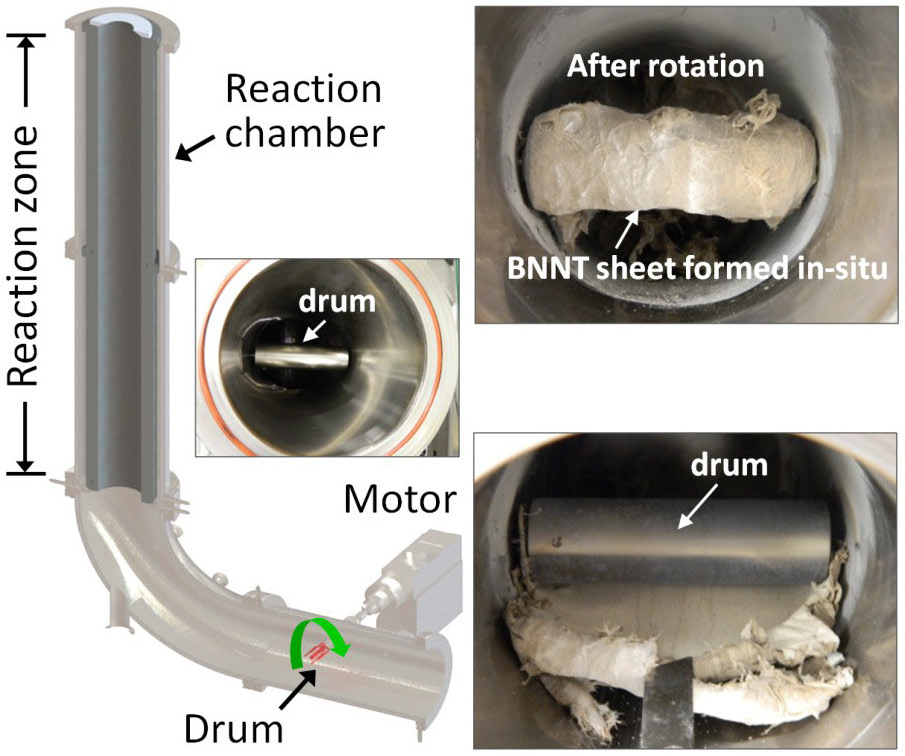
Meters-long BN buckypaper sheets can be fabricated by adding a cylindrical drum to the above reactor.

All well-established techniques of carbon nanotube growth, such as arc-discharge, laser ablation and chemical vapor deposition, are used for mass-production of BN nanotubes at a tens of grams scale.

BN nanotubes can also be produced by ball milling of amorphous boron, mixed with a catalyst (iron powder), under NH_{3} atmosphere. Subsequent annealing at ~1100 °C in nitrogen flow transforms most of the product into BN. During ball milling, the repeated impact and friction cause mechanical deformation and increased defect density in the boron particles. This mechanical activation enhances the diffusion of nitrogen into the boron particles during the annealing stage, promoting the formation of BNNTs. Long milling time contributes to producing a high yield of BNNTs by enhancing the reaction between boron and NH_{3}, leading to the formation of more nucleation sites, which in turn promotes the production of BNNTs. This method is relatively cheaper but produced BNNTs have a significant amount of impurities. A high-temperature high-pressure method is also suitable for BN nanotube synthesis.

BNNT production route has been a significant issue due to low yield and poor quality in comparison with CNT, thus limiting its practical uses. However, many great successes in BNNT synthesis have been achieved in recent years, enabling access to this material and paving the way for the development of promising applications Recently significant advancement have been made by Deakin University Australia with a 'novel and scalable' manufacturing process will allow the production of BNNTs in large quantities for the first time since the material was first discovered two decades ago. Australian listed ASX entity PPK Group (ASX:PPK) signed a joint venture agreement with Deakin in November 2018 to form BNNT Technology Limited, with the goal of manufacturing boron nitride nanotubes (BNNT) on a commercial basis. This collaboration is supported with investment by the Australian Government into BNNT Technology Limited and may significantly increase the world supply of BNNT unlocking a new array of applications, materials, composites and technologies.

== Properties and potential applications ==
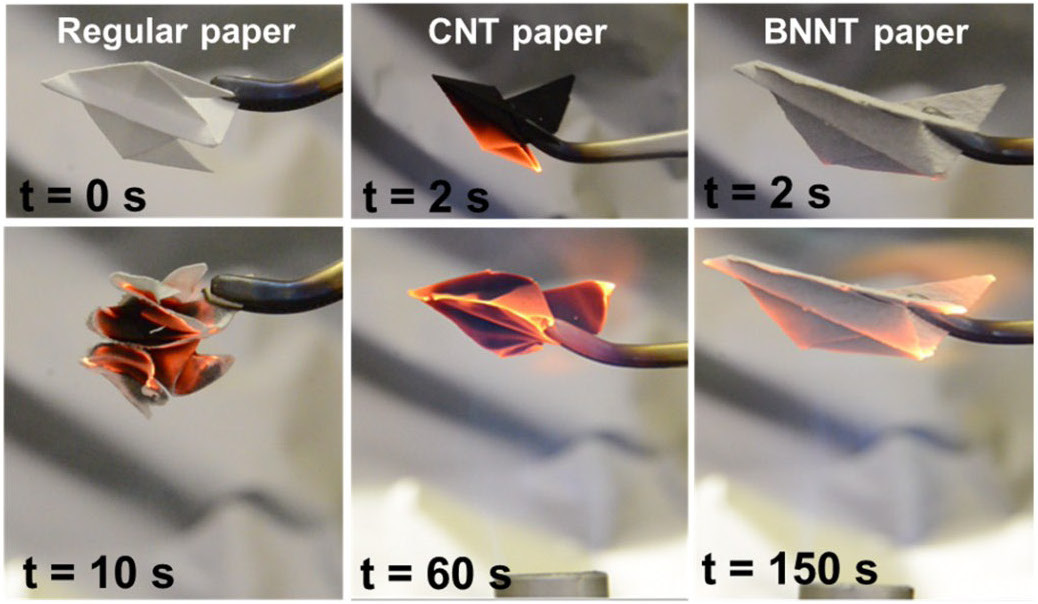
BN nanotube buckypaper is flame resistant, as shown in this comparative flame test of airplanes made of cellulose, carbon buckypaper and BN nanotube buckypaper.

Electrical and field emission properties of BN nanotubes can be tuned by doping with gold atoms via sputtering of gold on the nanotubes. Doping rare-earth atoms of europium turns a BN nanotube into a phosphor material emitting visible light under electron excitation. Quantum dots formed from 3 nm gold particles spaced across the nanotubes exhibit the properties of field-effect transistors at room temperature.

Like BN fibers, boron nitride nanotubes show promise for aerospace applications where integration of boron and in particular the light isotope of boron (^{10}B) into structural materials improves both their strength and their radiation-shielding properties; the improvement is due to strong neutron absorption by ^{10}B. Such ^{10}BN materials are of particular theoretical value as composite structural materials in future crewed interplanetary spacecraft, where absorption-shielding from cosmic ray spallation neutrons is expected to be a particular asset in light construction materials.

Due to Boron Nitride Nanotubes' stability in both oceanic and atmospheric conditions up to 800 °C, they are used in high-temperature applications such as thermal protection systems. BNNT mat shields large crafts from high aerothermal flux during atmospheric entry, descent, and landing. BNNTs are also beneficial for turbines or engines operating in high-temperature environments.

Toxicological investigations on BNNTs in vivo and in vitro showed low toxicity and in general, an enhanced chemical inertia, favoring its biocompatibility. Although not overtly toxic, the source of toxicity appears to be from the shape and the amount of BNNT/Impurities present. This was confirmed by a study that showed with increasing purity of BNNT a minor increase in toxicity. Their use in the biomedical field was suggested both as nanocarriers and as nanotransducers. BN nanotubes have also shown potential in certain cancer treatments.

High stiffness and excellent chemical stability makes BNNTs ideal material for reinforcement in polymers, ceramics and metals. For instance, buckypaper-based BNNT/epoxy composites and polyurethane-modified buckypaper composites have been successfully developed.^{1,16} These composite materials exhibit Young's moduli over twice the value for neat epoxy and 20 times the value for unimpregnated buckypaper. BNNTs are also one of the most promising classes of material for reinforcing aluminum-based structures.^{17} The low reactivity of BNNTs facilitates the integration of this material into an aluminum matrix where CNTs fail due to the reaction between the carbon and the aluminum which forms the undesired Al_{4}C_{3} phase at the interface. BNNTs also exhibit much higher oxidation temperature (~950 °C) than the melting point of aluminum (660 °C), which enables the homogenous dispersion of BNNTs directly into the aluminum melt. Since BNNTs retain their mechanical properties at high temperatures while having a very low density, the development of new temperature-resistant lightweight MMC is achievable. BNNTs also exhibit good thermal conductivity. This renders them useful for applications in nanoelectronics where heat dissipation is critical. This also makes BNNTs multifunctional as it not only improves the stiffness of composites but also yields high thermal conductivity along with high transparency. The combination of high stiffness and high transparency is already exploited in the development of BNNT-reinforced glass composites.^{18} Other intrinsic properties of BNNTs such as good radiation shielding ability,^{19} high electrical resistance and excellent piezoelectric properties are likely to promote interest for integrating them in new applications.
