= Zirconium chloride =

Zirconium chloride refers to:

- Zirconium(II) chloride; black solid
- Zirconium(III) chloride; blue-black and air-sensitive
- Zirconium(IV) chloride, or zirconium tetrachloride; white and easily hydrolyzed
