= Zirconium bromide =

Zirconium bromide may refer to:

- Zirconium(IV) bromide (zirconium tetrabromide), ZrBr_{4}
- Zirconium(III) bromide (zirconium tribromide), ZrBr_{3}
