= Zirconium(III) iodide =

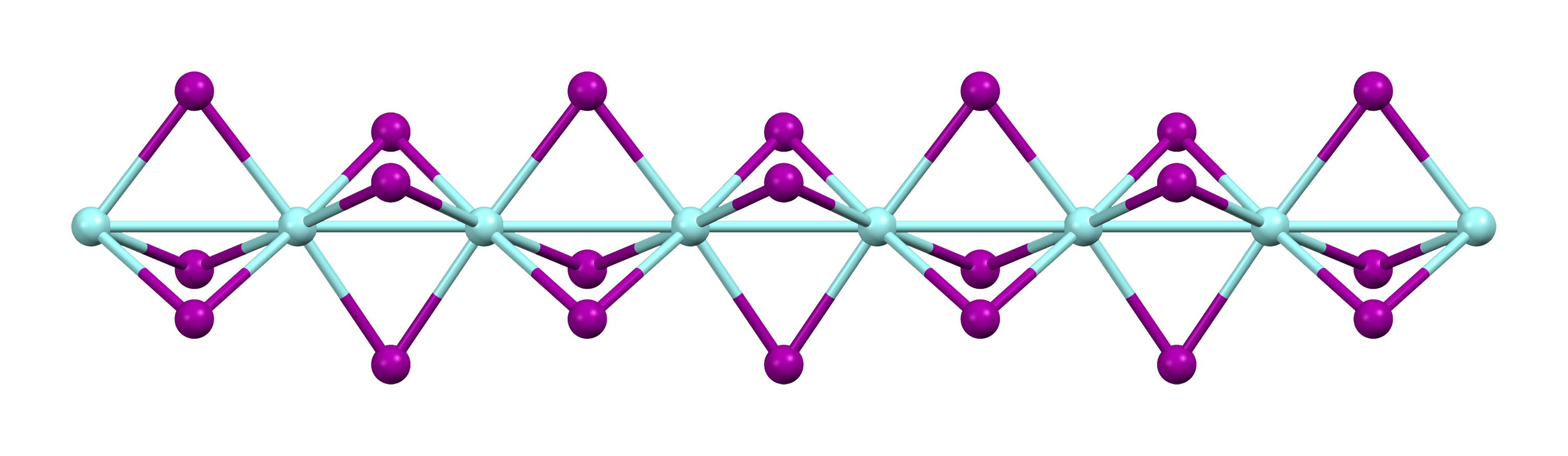
- Ball-and-stick model of a polymer chain of face-sharing octahedra in the crystal structure of zirconium(III) iodide

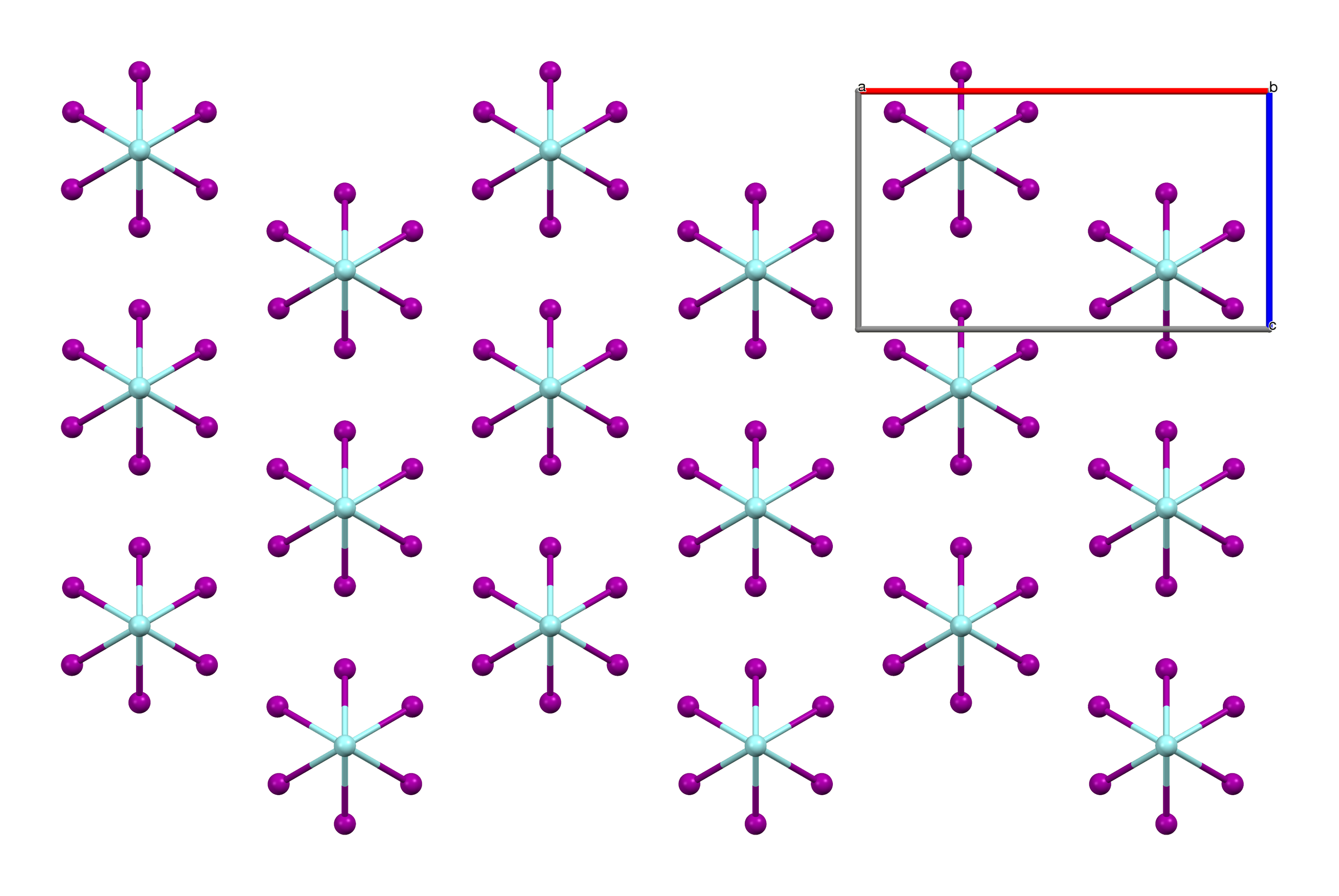
- Ball-and-stick model of the packing of polymer chains in the crystal structure of zirconium(III) iodide

Names
- IUPAC name Zirconium triiodide

Identifiers
CAS Number	13779-87-8
3D model (JSmol)	Interactive image
PubChem CID	157424840
- InChI: InChI=1S/3HI.Zr/h3*1H;/q;;;+3/p-3 Key: BPVKTQRLRAVYEX-UHFFFAOYSA-K
- SMILES: [Zr+3].[I-].[I-].[I-]

Properties
Chemical formula	I_{3}Zr
Molar mass	471.937 g·mol^{−1}
Appearance	dark blue crystals
Melting point	727 °C (1,341 °F; 1,000 K)

Structure
Crystal structure	Orthorhombic
Space group	Pmmn, No. 59
Lattice constant	a = 12.594 Å, b = 6.679 Å, c = 7.292 Å

Related compounds
Other anions	Zirconium(III) chloride Zirconium(III) bromide
Other cations	Titanium(III) iodide Hafnium(III) iodide
Related compounds	Zirconium(IV) iodide
- Except where otherwise noted, data are given for materials in their standard state (at 25 °C [77 °F], 100 kPa). Infobox references

Zirconium(III) iodide is an inorganic compound with the formula ZrI_{3}.

== Preparation ==
Like other group 4 trihalides, zirconium(III) iodide can be prepared from zirconium(IV) iodide by high-temperature reduction with zirconium metal, although incomplete reaction and contamination of the product with excess metal often occurs.

3 ZrI_{4} + Zr → 4 ZrI_{3}

An alternative is to crystallise zirconium(III) iodide from a solution of zirconium(III) in aluminium triiodide. The solution is prepared by reducing a eutectic solution of ZrI_{4} in liquid AlI_{3} at a temperature of 280–300 °C with metallic zirconium or aluminium.

== Structure and bonding ==
Zirconium(III) iodide has a lower magnetic moment than is expected for the d^{1} metal ion Zr^{3+}, indicating non-negligible Zr–Zr bonding.

The crystal structure of zirconium(III) iodide is based on hexagonal close packing of iodide ions with one third of the octahedral interstices occupied by Zr^{3+} ions. The structure consists of parallel chains of face-sharing {ZrI_{6}} octahedra with unequally spaced metal atoms. The Zr–Zr separation alternates between 3.17 Å and 3.51 Å.

ZrCl_{3}, ZrBr_{3} and ZrI_{3} adopt structures very similar to the β-TiCl_{3} structure. In all three ZrX_{3} there is some elongation of the octahedra along the metal-metal axis, partly due to metal-metal repulsion, but the elongation is most pronounced in the chloride, moderate in the bromide and negligible in the iodide.
