= Zirconium difluoride =

Names
- IUPAC name difluorozirconium
- Other names Zirconium(II) fluoride

Identifiers
CAS Number	13842-94-9
3D model (JSmol)	Interactive image
ChemSpider	123140
PubChem CID	139626
UNII	1XHF39056H
CompTox Dashboard (EPA)	DTXSID40160672
- InChI: InChI=1S/2FH.Zr/h2*1H;/q;;+2/p-2 Key: COSHNDIHSFYGTR-UHFFFAOYSA-L
- SMILES: F[Zr]F

Properties
Chemical formula	ZrF_{2}
Appearance	black crystals
Density	3.6 g/cm^{3}
Melting point	902
- Except where otherwise noted, data are given for materials in their standard state (at 25 °C [77 °F], 100 kPa). Infobox references

Zirconium difluoride is an inorganic chemical compound with the chemical formula ZrF_{2}.

== Synthesis ==
Zirconium difluoride can be prepared by the action of atomic hydrogen on thin layers of zirconium tetrafluoride, at a temperature of approximately 350 °C.

== Physical properties ==
ZrF_{2} forms black crystals of the orthorhombic system, with unit cell parameters a = 0.409 nm, b = 0.491 nm, c = 0.656 nm.

The compound readily ignites and burns to form zirconium dioxide.

== Chemical properties ==
ZrF_{2} disproportionates when heated to 800 °C:

2ZrF_{2} → ZrF_{4} + Zr
