= Zirconium(III) bromide =

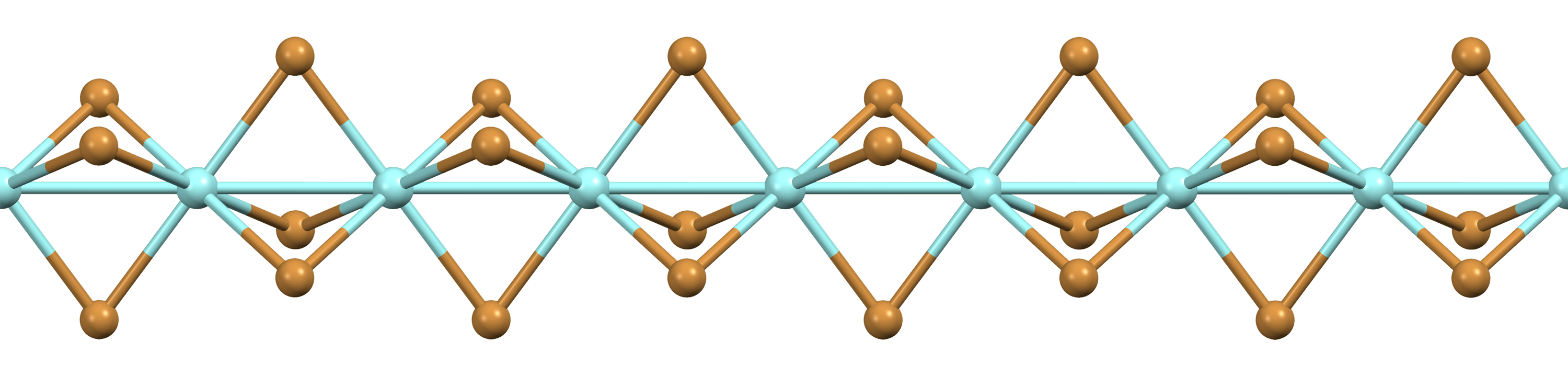
- Ball-and-stick model of a polymer chain of face-sharing octahedra in the crystal structure of zirconium(III) bromide

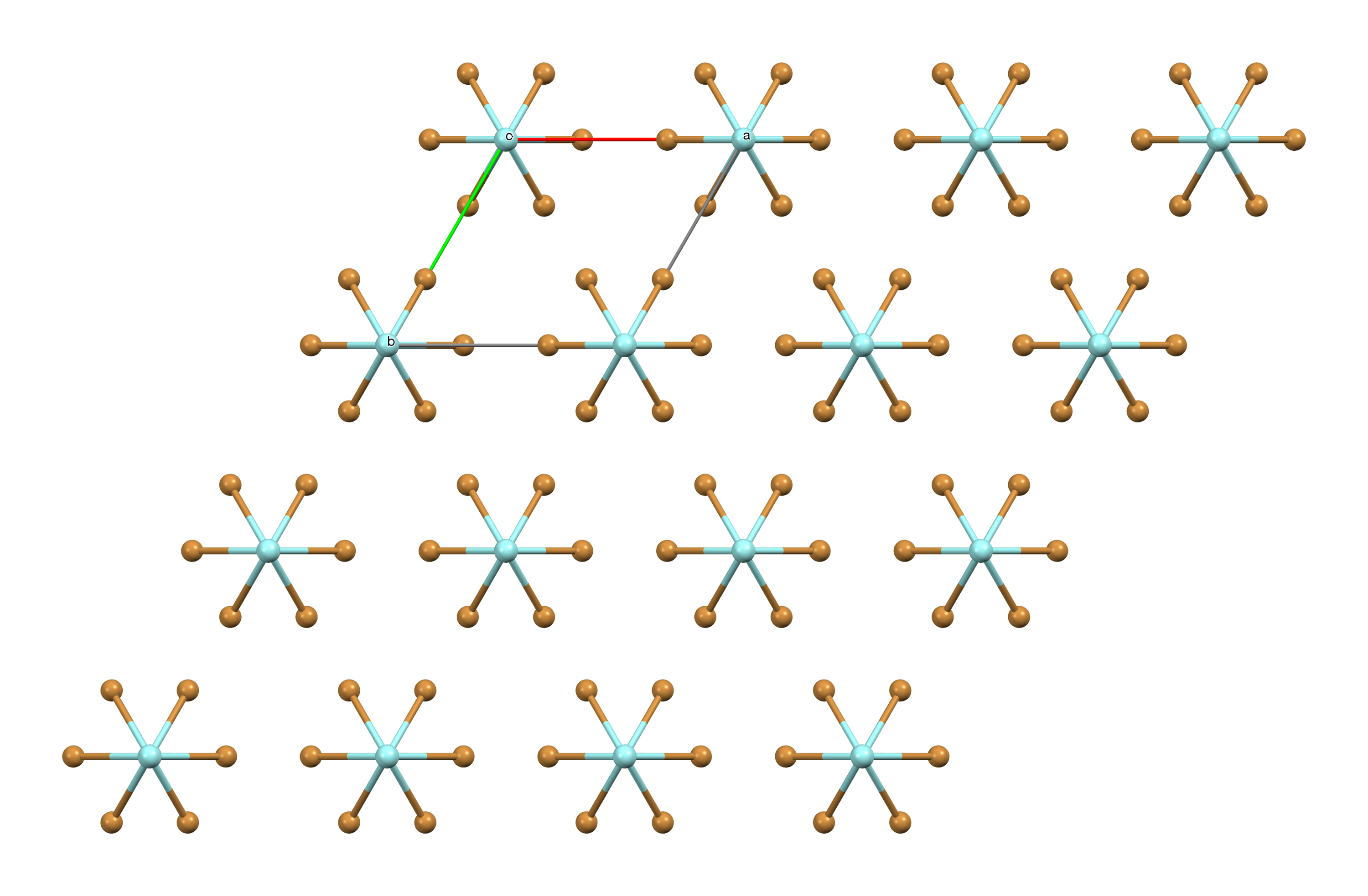
- Ball-and-stick model of the packing of polymer chains in the crystal structure of zirconium(III) bromide

Names
- IUPAC name Zirconium tribromide

Identifiers
CAS Number	24621-18-9
3D model (JSmol)	Interactive image
ChemSpider	8185694
PubChem CID	10010115
- InChI: InChI=1S/3BrH.Zr/h3*1H;/q;;;+3/p-3 Key: YRDBVAQLYFVSFE-UHFFFAOYSA-K
- SMILES: Br[Zr](Br)Br

Properties
Chemical formula	Br_{3}Zr
Molar mass	330.936 g·mol^{−1}
Appearance	black

Structure
Crystal structure	Hexagonal
Space group	P6_{3}/mcm, No. 193
Lattice constant	a = 6.728 Å, c = 6.299 Å α = 90°, β = 90°, γ = 120°

Related compounds
Other anions	Zirconium(III) chloride Zirconium(III) iodide
Other cations	Titanium(III) bromide Hafnium(III) bromide
Related compounds	Zirconium(IV) bromide
- Except where otherwise noted, data are given for materials in their standard state (at 25 °C [77 °F], 100 kPa). Infobox references

Zirconium(III) bromide is an inorganic compound with the formula ZrBr_{3}.

== Preparation ==
Almost all the trihalides of titanium, zirconium and hafnium can be prepared by the high-temperature reduction of the corresponding tetrahalide with the metal. Incomplete reaction and contamination of the product with excess metal often occurs.

Zirconium(III) bromide can thus be prepared from zirconium(IV) bromide and zirconium foil.

3 ZrBr_{4} + Zr → 4 ZrBr_{3}

Alternatively, zirconium(III) bromide crystallises from a solution of zirconium(III) in aluminium tribromide. The solution is prepared by reducing a eutectic solution of ZrBr_{4} in liquid AlBr_{3} at a temperature of 230–300 °C with metallic zirconium or aluminium.

== Structure and bonding ==
Zirconium(III) bromide has a lower magnetic moment than is expected for the d^{1} metal ion Zr^{3+}, indicating non-negligible Zr-Zr bonding.

The crystal structure of zirconium(III) bromide is based on hexagonal close packing of bromide ions with one third of the octahedral interstices occupied by Zr^{3+} ions. The structure consists of parallel chains of face-sharing {ZrBr_{6}} octahedra with equally spaced metal atoms. There is some elongation of the octahedra along the metal-metal axis, partly due to metal-metal repulsion. ZrCl_{3}, ZrBr_{3} and ZrI_{3} all adopt the β-TiCl_{3} structure, but the elongation of octahedra is most pronounced in the chloride, moderate in the bromide and negligible in the iodide.
