= Zirconium dichloride =

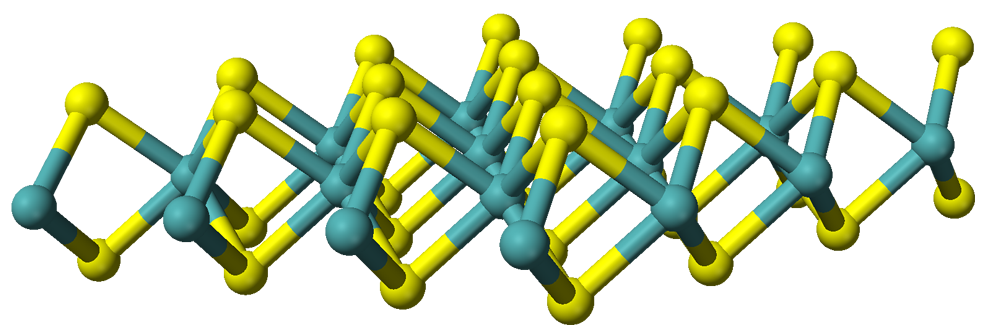

Names
- IUPAC name dichloridozirconium
- Other names Zirconium(II) chloride

Identifiers
3D model (JSmol)	Interactive image
ChemSpider	126253
PubChem CID	143120
- InChI: InChI=1S/2ClH.Zr/h2*1H;/q;;+2/p-2 Key: VPGLGRNSAYHXPY-UHFFFAOYSA-L
- SMILES: Cl[Zr]Cl

Properties
Chemical formula	ZrCl_{2}
Appearance	black solid
Density	3.6 g/cm^{3}
Melting point	722
- Except where otherwise noted, data are given for materials in their standard state (at 25 °C [77 °F], 100 kPa). Infobox references

Zirconium dichloride is an inorganic chemical compound with the chemical formula ZrCl_{2}. ZrCl_{2} is a black solid. It adopts a layered structure as molybdenum disulfide

The compound can be formed by heating zirconium monochloride and zirconium tetrachloride:

2ZrCl + ZrCl_{4} → 3ZrCl_{2}

== Related compounds ==
- Zirconium diiodide.
