= Zirconium(IV) iodide =

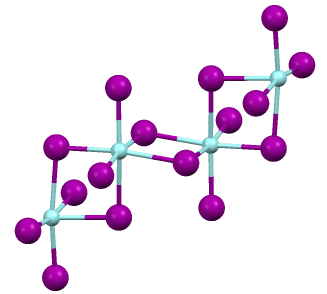

Names
- Other names zirconium tetraiodide

Identifiers
CAS Number	13986-26-0
3D model (JSmol)	Interactive image
ChemSpider	75903
ECHA InfoCard	100.034.332
EC Number	237-780-9
PubChem CID	84133
UNII	H6NZC1810V
CompTox Dashboard (EPA)	DTXSID90894910
- InChI: InChI=1S/4HI.Zr/h4*1H;/q;;;;+4/p-4 Key: XLMQAUWIRARSJG-UHFFFAOYSA-J; InChI=1/4HI.Zr/h4*1H;/q;;;;+4/p-4 Key: XLMQAUWIRARSJG-XBHQNQODAZ
- SMILES: [Zr+4].[I-].[I-].[I-].[I-]

Properties
Chemical formula	ZrI_{4}
Molar mass	598.842 g·mol^{−1}
Appearance	orange-yellow crystalline hygroscopic
Density	4.914 g/cm^{3}
Melting point	499 °C (930 °F; 772 K) (triple point)
Boiling point	431 °C (808 °F; 704 K) (sublimes)

Structure
Crystal structure	Monoclinic, mP30
Space group	P2/c, No. 13

Hazards
- GHS labelling
Pictograms	(GHS05: Corrosive)
Signal word	Danger
Hazard statements	H314
Precautionary statements	P260, P264, P280, P301+P330+P331, P303+P361+P353, P304+P340, P305+P351+P338, P310, P321, P363, P405, P501
NFPA 704 (fire diamond)	3 0 2

Related compounds
Other anions	Zirconium(IV) fluoride Zirconium(IV) chloride Zirconium(IV) bromide
Other cations	Titanium tetraiodide Hafnium tetraiodide
- Except where otherwise noted, data are given for materials in their standard state (at 25 °C [77 °F], 100 kPa). verify (what is ?) Infobox references

Zirconium(IV) iodide is the chemical compound with the formula ZrI_{4}. It is the most readily available iodide of zirconium. It is an orange-coloured solid that degrades in the presence of water. The compound was once prominent as an intermediate in the purification of zirconium metal.

== Structure ==
Like most binary metal halides, zirconium(IV) iodide adopts a polymeric structure. As characterized by X-ray crystallography, the compound consists of octahedral Zr(IV) centers interconnected by four doubly bridging iodide ligands. The Zr-I distances of 2.692 (terminal) and 3.030 Å

== Synthesis and reactions ==
This compound can be prepared by heating zirconium metal and an excess of iodine. The solid is purified by sublimation (400 °C, 10-4 mm Hg).

2 I_{2} + Zr → ZrI_{4}

Pyrolysis of zirconium(IV) iodide gas by contact with a hot wire was the first industrial process for the commercial production of pure ductile metallic zirconium. This crystal bar process was developed by Anton Eduard van Arkel and Jan Hendrik de Boer in 1925.

Heating the tetraiodide with zirconium metal gives zirconium triiodide:

3 ZrI_{4} + 4 Zr → 7 ZrI_{3}
