= Titanium(III) iodide =

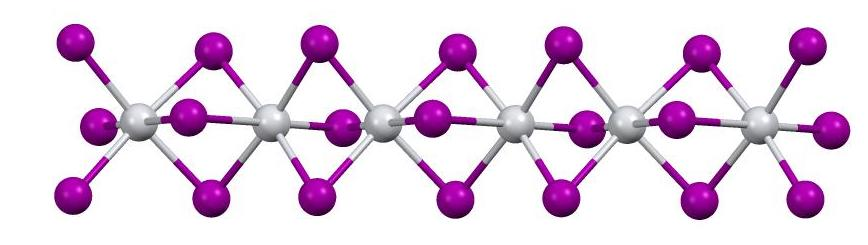

Names
- IUPAC name Titanium(III) iodide
- Other names Titanium triiodide

Identifiers
CAS Number	13783-08-9
3D model (JSmol)	Interactive image
PubChem CID	18955717
CompTox Dashboard (EPA)	DTXSID001314238
- InChI: InChI=1S/3HI.Ti/h3*1H;/q;;;+3/p-3 Key: HUYLAMJIPCOVOM-UHFFFAOYSA-K
- SMILES: I[Ti](I)I

Properties
Chemical formula	I_{3}Ti
Molar mass	428.580 g·mol^{−1}
Appearance	black-violet solid
Density	4.96 g·cm^{−3}

Related compounds
Other anions	Titanium(III) fluoride Titanium(III) bromide Titanium(III) chloride
Other cations	Zirconium(III) iodide Hafnium(III) iodide
Related compounds	Titanium(IV) iodide
- Except where otherwise noted, data are given for materials in their standard state (at 25 °C [77 °F], 100 kPa). Infobox references

Titanium(III) iodide is an inorganic compound with the formula TiI_{3}. It is a dark violet solid that is insoluble in solvents, except upon decomposition.

== Preparation and structure ==
Titanium(III) iodide can be prepared by reaction of titanium with iodine:

2 Ti + 3 I_{2} → 2 TiI_{3}

It can also be obtained by reduction of TiI_{4}, e.g., with aluminium.

In terms of its structure, the compound exists as a polymer of face-sharing octahedra. Above 323 K, the Ti---Ti spacings are equal, but below that temperature, the material undergoes a phase transition. In the low temperature phase, the Ti---Ti contacts are alternating short and long. The low temperature structure is similar to that of molybdenum tribromide.
