= Hafnium(III) iodide =

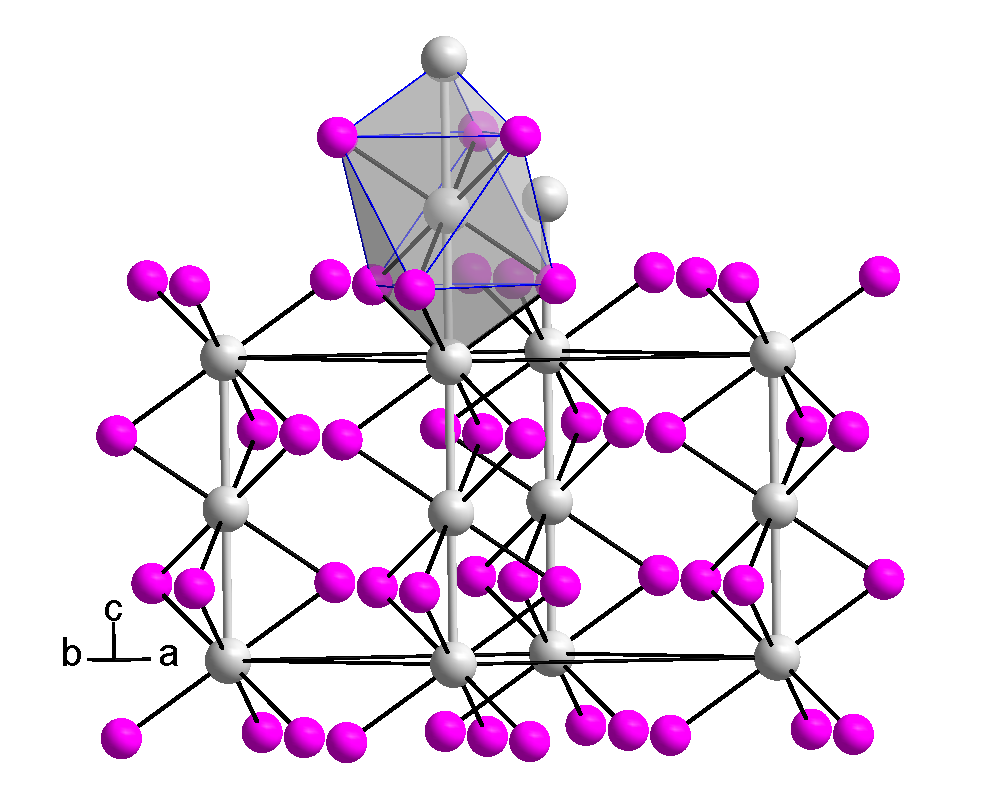
- Ball-and-stick model of the unit cell of the crystal structure of hafnium(III) iodide

Names
- IUPAC name Hafnium triiodide

Identifiers
CAS Number	13779-73-2
3D model (JSmol)	Interactive image
PubChem CID	161242838 charge error
- InChI: InChI=1S/Hf.3HI/h;3*1H/q+3;;;/p-3 Key: VAFXHNPAMHBKMS-UHFFFAOYSA-K
- SMILES: [I-].[I-].[I-].[Hf+3]

Properties
Chemical formula	HfI_{3}
Molar mass	559.20 g·mol^{−1}
Appearance	black crystals
Melting point	decomposes

Related compounds
Other anions	Hafnium(III) chloride Hafnium(III) bromide
Other cations	Titanium(III) iodide Zirconium(III) iodide
Related compounds	Hafnium(IV) iodide
- Except where otherwise noted, data are given for materials in their standard state (at 25 °C [77 °F], 100 kPa). Infobox references

Hafnium(III) iodide is an inorganic compound of hafnium and iodine with the formula Hf I_{3}. It is a black solid.

== Preparation ==
Like other group 4 trihalides, hafnium(III) iodide can be prepared from hafnium(IV) iodide by high-temperature reduction with hafnium metal, although incomplete reaction and contamination of the product with excess metal often occurs.

3 Hf I_{4} + Hf → 4 Hf I_{3}

Other metals can be used as the reducing agent, for example aluminium. The product is often nonstoichiometric, with the compositions Hf I_{3.2–3.3} and Hf I_{3.0–3.5} reported.

== Structure and bonding ==
Hafnium(III) iodide adopts the same crystal structure as zirconium(III) iodide. This is very similar to the β-TiCl_{3} structure. The structure is based on hexagonal close packing of iodide ions with one third of the octahedral interstices occupied by Hf^{3+} ions. It consists of parallel chains of face-sharing {HfI_{6}} octahedra.

Hafnium(III) iodide has a lower magnetic moment than is expected for the d^{1} metal ion Hf^{3+}, indicating non-negligible Hf–Hf bonding. The Hf–Hf separation was originally reported to be 3.295 Å, but a subsequent study of nonstoichiometric hafnium(III) iodide indicated a lower symmetry structure.

== Reactivity ==
Like the chloride and bromide, hafnium(III) iodide is a powerful enough reducing agent to reduce water and therefore does not have any aqueous chemistry.
