= Zirconium(II) iodide =

Names
- IUPAC name diiodozirconium
- Other names Zirconium diiodide

Identifiers
CAS Number	15513-85-6
3D model (JSmol)	Interactive image
ChemSpider	15745141
PubChem CID	136991
- InChI: InChI=1S/2HI.Zr/h2*1H;/q;;+2/p-2 Key: GODQOUBOGDKMGD-UHFFFAOYSA-L
- SMILES: [Zr](I)I

Properties
Chemical formula	ZrI_{2}
Appearance	solid
Melting point	827
- Except where otherwise noted, data are given for materials in their standard state (at 25 °C [77 °F], 100 kPa). Infobox references

Zirconium(II) iodide is an inorganic chemical compound with the chemical formula ZrI_{2}.

== Synthesis ==
Zirconium diiodide can be prepared from the ZrI_{3} by disproportionation at 360–390°. At higher temperatures, the diiodide disproportionates to the tetraiodide and metallic zirconium.
