= Hafnium(IV) iodide =

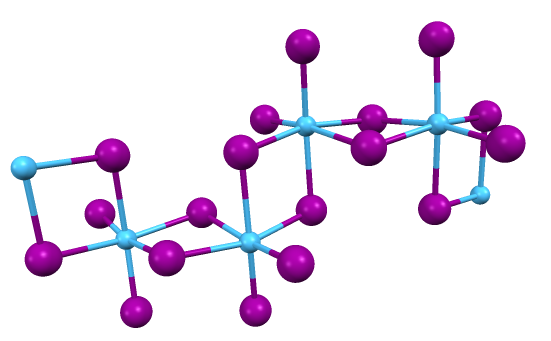

Names
- IUPAC name Hafnium(IV) iodide
- Other names hafnium tetraiodide, tetraiodohafnium

Identifiers
CAS Number	13777-23-6
3D model (JSmol)	Interactive image
ChemSpider	75548
ECHA InfoCard	100.150.349
EC Number	621-502-1
PubChem CID	83726
CompTox Dashboard (EPA)	DTXSID7065629
- InChI: InChI=1S/Hf.4HI/h;4*1H/q+4;;;;/p-4 Key: YCJQNNVSZNFWAH-UHFFFAOYSA-J
- SMILES: I[Hf](I)(I)I

Properties
Chemical formula	HfI_{4}
Molar mass	686.11
Appearance	red-orange
Density	5.60 g/cm^{3}
Melting point	449 °C (840 °F; 722 K)
Boiling point	394 °C (741 °F; 667 K) (sublimes)

Structure
Crystal structure	Monoclinic, mS40
Space group	C2/c, No. 15
Lattice constant	a = 1.1787 nm, b = 1.1801 nm, c = 1.2905 nm

Related compounds
Other anions	Hafnium(IV) fluoride Hafnium(IV) chloride Hafnium(IV) bromide
Other cations	Titanium(IV) iodide Zirconium(IV) iodide
Related compounds	Hafnium(III) iodide
- Except where otherwise noted, data are given for materials in their standard state (at 25 °C [77 °F], 100 kPa). Infobox references

Hafnium(IV) iodide is the inorganic compound with the formula HfI_{4}. It is a red-orange, moisture sensitive, sublimable solid that is produced by heating a mixture of hafnium with excess iodine. It is an intermediate in the crystal bar process for producing hafnium metal.

In this compound, the hafnium centers adopt octahedral coordination geometry. Like most binary metal halides, the compound is a polymeric. It is one-dimensional polymer consisting of chains of edge-shared bioctahedral Hf_{2}I_{8} subunits, similar to the motif adopted by HfCl_{4}. The nonbridging iodide ligands have shorter bonds to Hf than the bridging iodide ligands.
