= Hydration isomerism =

In coordination chemistry, hydration isomerism is a kind of isomerism that is observed in some solids. Hydration isomers have identical formula but differ with respect to the numbers of water ligands.

== Examples ==
One example is the pair [CrCl(H_{2}O)_{5}]Cl_{2}•H_{2}O and [Cr(H_{2}O)_{6}]Cl_{3}. The former has one water of crystallization but the latter does not.

Another example is the pair of titanium(III) chlorides, [Ti(H_{2}O)_{6}]Cl_{3} and [Ti(H_{2}O)_{4}Cl_{2}]Cl(H_{2}O)_{2}. The former is violet and the latter, with two molecules of water of crystallization, is green.
