= Titanium tetraiodide =

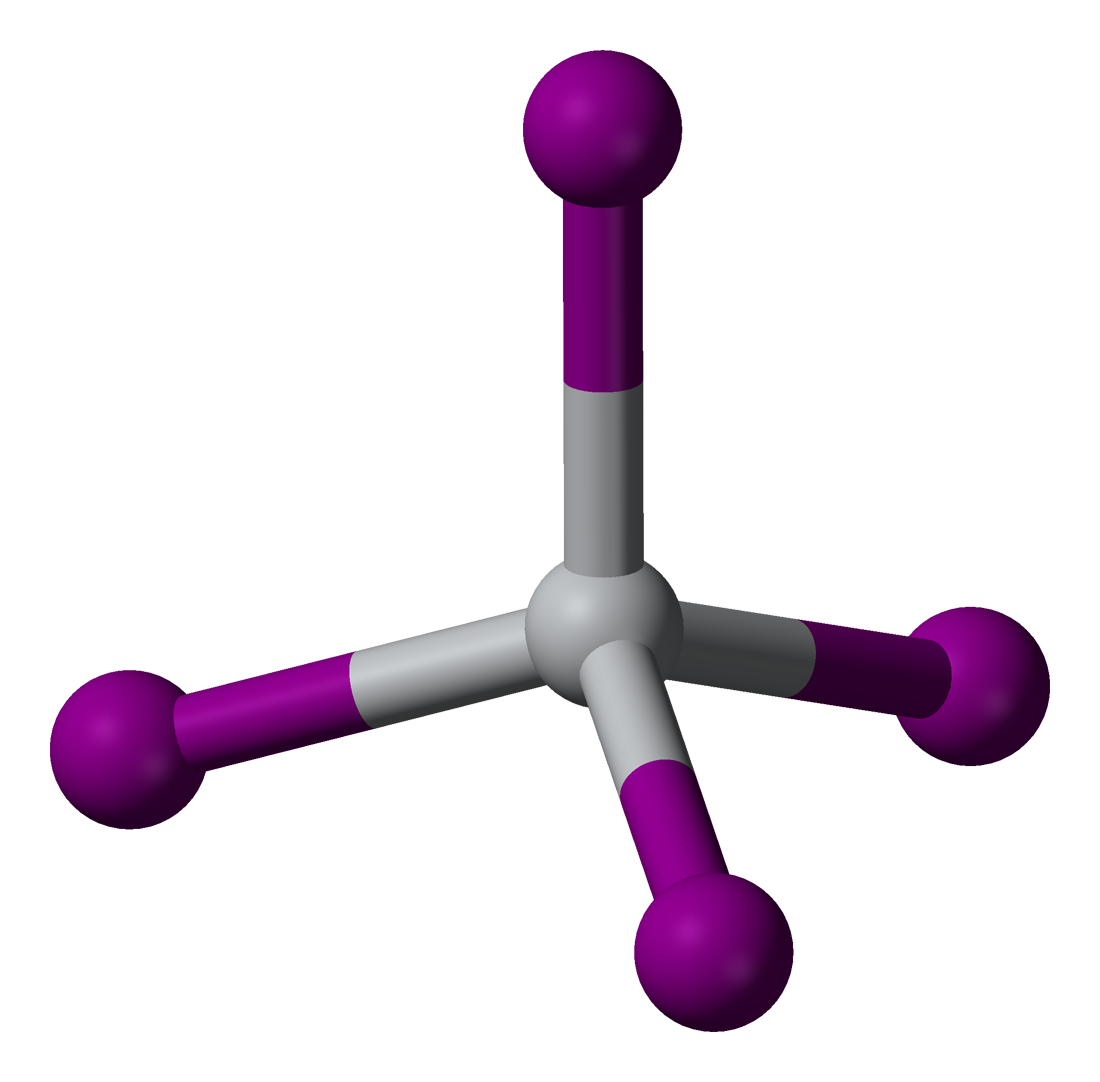
- Titanium tetraiodide

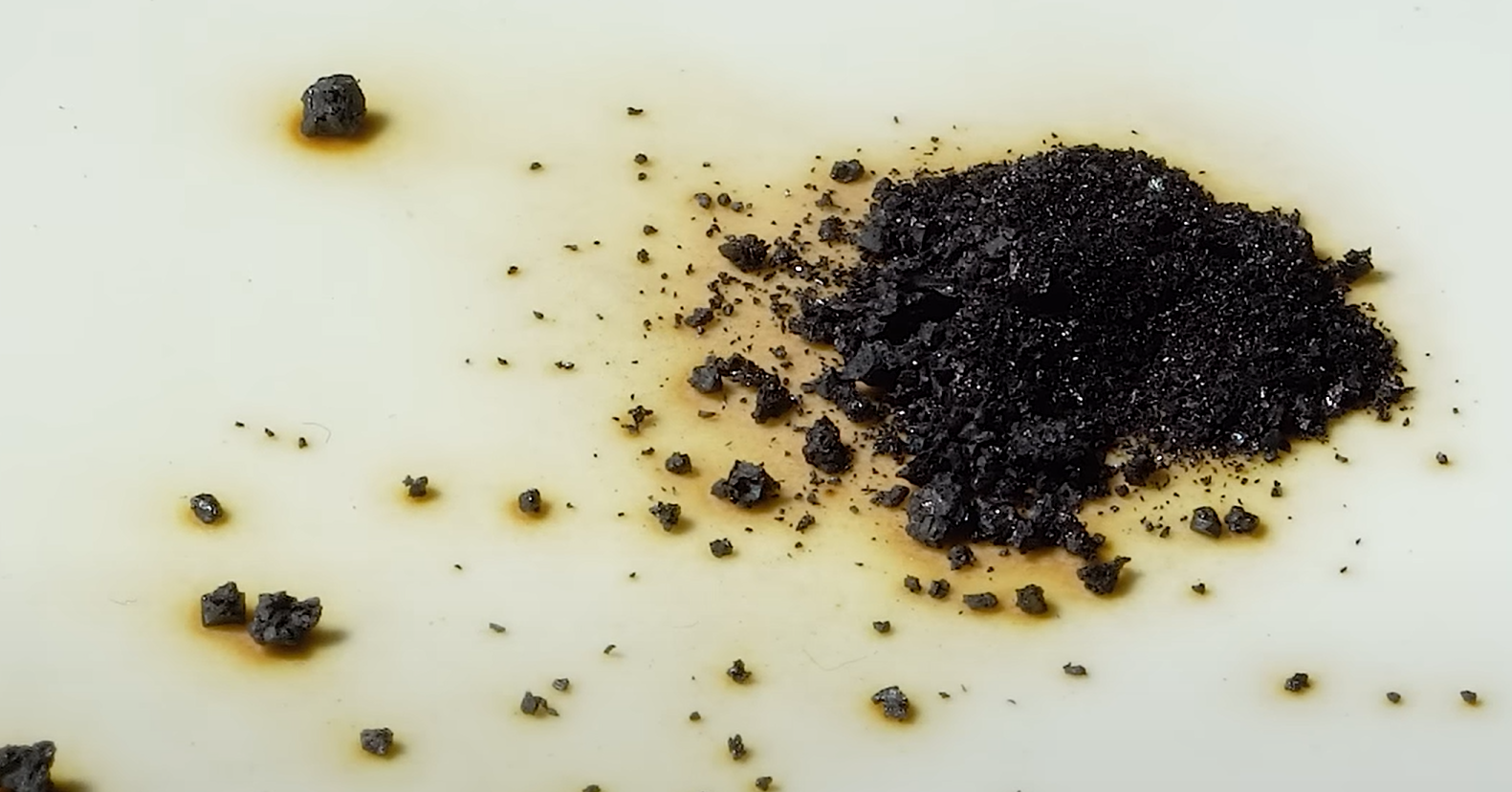
- Titanium tetraiodide

Names
- IUPAC name Titanium(IV) iodide
- Other names Titanium tetraiodide

Identifiers
CAS Number	7720-83-4
3D model (JSmol)	Interactive image
ChemSpider	99888
ECHA InfoCard	100.028.868
EC Number	231-754-0
PubChem CID	111328
CompTox Dashboard (EPA)	DTXSID8064779
- InChI: InChI=1S/4HI.Ti/h4*1H;/q;;;;+4/p-4 Key: NLLZTRMHNHVXJJ-UHFFFAOYSA-J; InChI=1/4HI.Ti/h4*1H;/q;;;;+4/p-4/rI4Ti/c1-5(2,3)4 Key: NLLZTRMHNHVXJJ-CDYINDSBAY
- SMILES: [Ti](I)(I)(I)I

Properties
Chemical formula	TiI_{4}
Molar mass	555.485 g/mol
Appearance	red-brown crystals
Density	4.3 g/cm^{3}
Melting point	150 °C (302 °F; 423 K)
Boiling point	377 °C (711 °F; 650 K)
Solubility in water	hydrolysis
Solubility in other solvents	soluble in CH_{2}Cl_{2} CHCl_{3} CS_{2}

Structure
Crystal structure	cubic (a = 12.21 Å)
Coordination geometry	tetrahedral
Dipole moment	0 D

Hazards
- Occupational safety and health (OHS/OSH)
Main hazards	violent hydrolysis corrosive
- GHS labelling
Pictograms	(GHS05: Corrosive)
Signal word	Danger
Hazard statements	H314
Precautionary statements	P260, P264, P280, P301+P330+P331, P303+P361+P353, P304+P340, P305+P351+P338, P310, P321, P363, P405, P501

Related compounds
Other anions	Titanium(IV) bromide Titanium(IV) chloride Titanium(IV) fluoride
Other cations	Silicon tetraiodide Zirconium(IV) iodide Hafnium(IV) iodide
Related compounds	Titanium(III) iodide
- Except where otherwise noted, data are given for materials in their standard state (at 25 °C [77 °F], 100 kPa). verify (what is ?) Infobox references

Titanium tetraiodide is an inorganic compound with the formula TiI_{4}. It is a black volatile solid, first reported by Rudolph Weber in 1863. It is an intermediate in the van Arkel–de Boer process for the purification of titanium.

== Physical properties ==
TiI_{4} is a rare molecular binary metal iodide, consisting of isolated molecules of tetrahedral Ti(IV) centers. The Ti-I distances are 261 pm. Reflecting its molecular character, TiI_{4} can be distilled without decomposition at one atmosphere; this property is the basis of its use in the van Arkel–de Boer process. The difference in melting point between TiCl_{4} (m.p. -24 °C) and TiI_{4} (m.p. 150 °C) is comparable to the difference between the melting points of CCl_{4} (m.p. -23 °C) and CI_{4} (m.p. 168 °C), reflecting the stronger intermolecular van der Waals bonding in the iodides.

Two polymorphs of TiI_{4} exist, one of which is highly soluble in organic solvents. In the less soluble cubic form, the Ti-I distances are 261 pm.

== Production ==
Three methods are well known: 1) From the elements, typically using a tube furnace at 425 °C:

Ti + 2 I_{2} → TiI_{4}

This reaction can be reversed to produce highly pure films of Ti metal.

2) Exchange reaction from titanium tetrachloride and HI.

TiCl_{4} + 4 HI → TiI_{4} + 4 HCl

3) Oxide-iodide exchange from aluminium iodide.

3 TiO_{2} + 4 AlI_{3} → 3 TiI_{4} + 2 Al_{2}O_{3}

== Reactions ==
Like TiCl_{4} and TiBr_{4}, TiI_{4} forms adducts with Lewis bases, and it can also be reduced. When the reduction is conducted in the presence of Ti metal, one obtains polymeric Ti(III) and Ti(II) derivatives such as CsTi_{2}I_{7} and the chain CsTiI_{3}, respectively.

TiI_{4} exhibits extensive reactivity toward alkenes and alkynes resulting in organoiodine derivatives. It also effects pinacol couplings and other C-C bond-forming reactions.
