= Zirconium =

Chemical element with atomic number 40

Zirconium, _{40}Zr
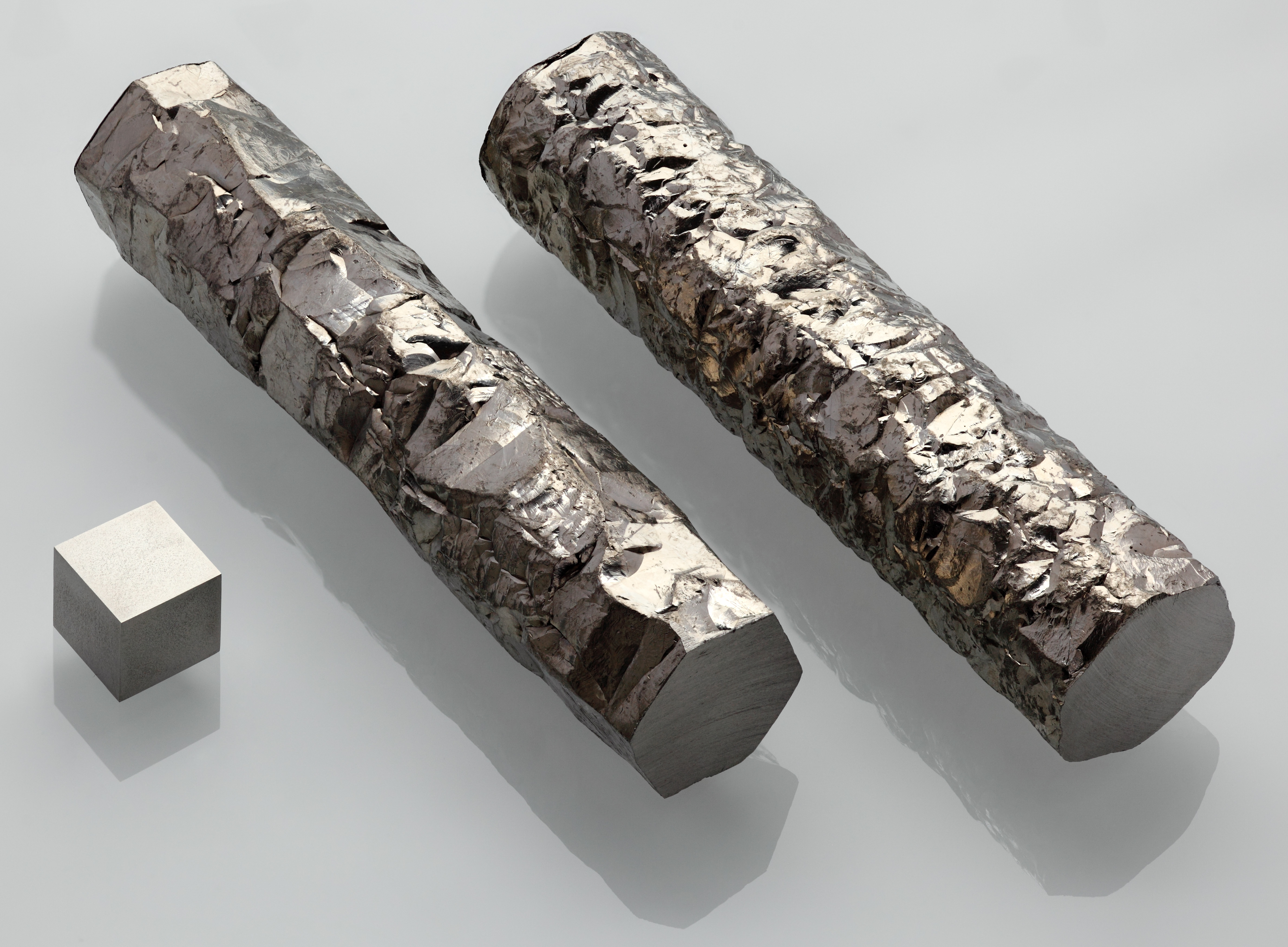

Zirconium
- Pronunciation: /zɜːrˈkoʊniəm/ (zur-KOH-nee-əm)
- Appearance: silvery white

Standard atomic weight A_{r}°(Zr)
- 91.222±0.003; 91.222±0.003 (abridged)

Zirconium in the periodic table
Hydrogen																															Helium
Lithium	Beryllium																									Boron	Carbon	Nitrogen	Oxygen	Fluorine	Neon
Sodium	Magnesium																									Aluminium	Silicon	Phosphorus	Sulfur	Chlorine	Argon
Potassium	Calcium															Scandium	Titanium	Vanadium	Chromium	Manganese	Iron	Cobalt	Nickel	Copper	Zinc	Gallium	Germanium	Arsenic	Selenium	Bromine	Krypton
Rubidium	Strontium															Yttrium	Zirconium	Niobium	Molybdenum	Technetium	Ruthenium	Rhodium	Palladium	Silver	Cadmium	Indium	Tin	Antimony	Tellurium	Iodine	Xenon
Caesium	Barium	Lanthanum	Cerium	Praseodymium	Neodymium	Promethium	Samarium	Europium	Gadolinium	Terbium	Dysprosium	Holmium	Erbium	Thulium	Ytterbium	Lutetium	Hafnium	Tantalum	Tungsten	Rhenium	Osmium	Iridium	Platinum	Gold	Mercury (element)	Thallium	Lead	Bismuth	Polonium	Astatine	Radon
Francium	Radium	Actinium	Thorium	Protactinium	Uranium	Neptunium	Plutonium	Americium	Curium	Berkelium	Californium	Einsteinium	Fermium	Mendelevium	Nobelium	Lawrencium	Rutherfordium	Dubnium	Seaborgium	Bohrium	Hassium	Meitnerium	Darmstadtium	Roentgenium	Copernicium	Nihonium	Flerovium	Moscovium	Livermorium	Tennessine	Oganesson
Ti
↑
Zr
↓
Hf
yttrium ← zirconium → niobium
- Atomic number (Z): 40
- Group: group 4
- Period: period 5
- Block: d-block
- Electron configuration: [Kr] 4d^{2} 5s^{2}
- Electrons per shell: 2, 8, 18, 10, 2

Physical properties
- Phase at STP: solid
- Melting point: 2125 K (1852 °C, 3365 °F)
- Boiling point: 4650 K (4377 °C, 7911 °F)
- Density (at 20° C): 6.505 g/cm^{3}
- when liquid (at m.p.): 5.8 g/cm^{3}
- Heat of fusion: 14 kJ/mol
- Heat of vaporization: 591 kJ/mol
- Molar heat capacity: 25.36 J/(mol·K)
- Specific heat capacity: 277.997 J/(kg·K)
Vapor pressure
P (Pa)	1	10	100	1 k	10 k	100 k
at T (K)	2639	2891	3197	3575	4053	4678

Atomic properties
- Oxidation states: common: +4 −2, 0, +1, +2, +3
- Electronegativity: Pauling scale: 1.33
- Ionization energies: 1st: 640.1 kJ/mol; 2nd: 1270 kJ/mol; 3rd: 2218 kJ/mol
- Atomic radius: empirical: 160 pm
- Covalent radius: 175±7 pm
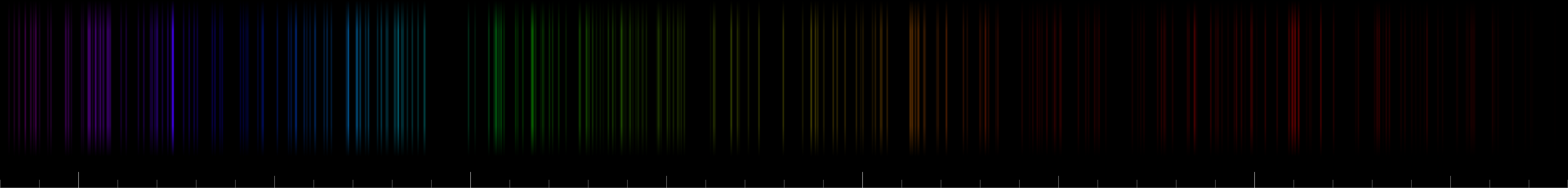
- Spectral lines of zirconium

Other properties
- Natural occurrence: primordial
- Crystal structure: hexagonal close-packed (hcp) (hP2)
- Lattice constants: a = 323.22 pm c = 514.79 pm (at 20 °C)
- Thermal expansion: 5.69×10^{−6}/K (at 20 °C) (Note: The thermal expansion of a zirconium crystal is anisotropic: the parameters (at 20 °C) for each crystal axis are α_{a} = 4.91×10^{−6}/K, α_{c} = 7.26×10^{−6}/K, and α_{average} = α_{V}/3 = 5.69×10^{−6}/K.)
- Thermal conductivity: 22.6 W/(m⋅K)
- Electrical resistivity: 421 nΩ⋅m (at 20 °C)
- Magnetic ordering: paramagnetic
- Young's modulus: 88 GPa
- Shear modulus: 33 GPa
- Bulk modulus: 91.1 GPa
- Speed of sound thin rod: 3800 m/s (at 20 °C)
- Poisson ratio: 0.34
- Mohs hardness: 5.0
- Vickers hardness: 820–1800 MPa
- Brinell hardness: 638–1880 MPa
- CAS Number: 7440-67-7

History
- Naming: after zircon, zargun زرگون meaning "gold-colored"
- Discovery: Martin Heinrich Klaproth (1789)
- First isolation: Jöns Jakob Berzelius (1824)

Isotopes of zirconium
Main isotopes			Decay	
Isotope	abundance	half-life (t_{1/2})	mode	product
^{88}Zr	synth	83.4 d	ε	^{88}Y
^{89}Zr	synth	78.36 h	β^{+}	^{89}Y
^{90}Zr	51.45%	stable		
^{91}Zr	11.22%	stable		
^{92}Zr	17.15%	stable		
^{93}Zr	(unstable)	1.61×10^{6} y	β^{−}	^{93}Nb
^{94}Zr	17.38%	stable		
^{95}Zr	synth	64.032 d	β^{−}	^{95}Nb
^{96}Zr	2.80%	2.1×10^{19} y	β^{−}β^{−}	^{96}Mo
^{96}Zr	2.80%	2.1×10^{19} y	β^{−}	^{96}Nb

Zirconium is a chemical element; it has symbol Zr and atomic number 40. First identified in 1789, isolated in impure form in 1824, and manufactured at scale by 1925, pure zirconium is a lustrous transition metal with a greyish-white color that closely resembles hafnium and, to a lesser extent, titanium. It is solid at room temperature, ductile, malleable and corrosion-resistant. The name zirconium is derived from the name of the mineral zircon, the most important source of zirconium. The word is related to Persian zargun (zircon; zar-gun, "gold-like" or "as gold"). Besides zircon, zirconium occurs in over 140 other minerals, including baddeleyite and eudialyte; most zirconium is produced as a byproduct of minerals mined for titanium and tin.

Zirconium forms a variety of inorganic compounds, such as zirconium dioxide, and organometallic compounds, such as zirconocene dichloride. Five isotopes occur naturally, four of which are stable. The metal and its alloys are mainly used as a refractory and opacifier; zirconium alloys are used to clad nuclear fuel rods due to their low neutron absorption and strong resistance to corrosion, and in space vehicles and turbine blades where high heat resistance is necessary. Zirconium also finds uses in flashbulbs, biomedical applications such as dental implants and prosthetics, deodorant, and water purification systems.

Zirconium compounds have no known biological role, though the element is widely distributed in nature and appears in small quantities in biological systems without adverse effects. There is no indication of zirconium as a carcinogen. The main hazards posed by zirconium are flammability in powder form and irritation of the eyes.

== Characteristics ==
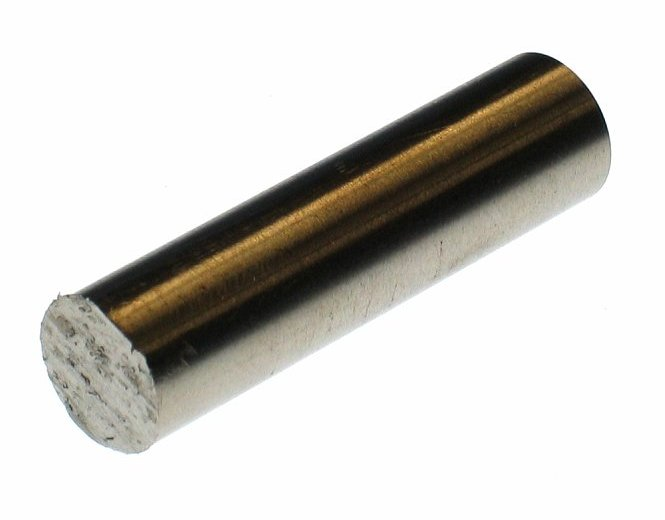
Zirconium rod

Zirconium is a lustrous, greyish-white, soft, ductile, malleable metal that is solid at room temperature, though it is hard and brittle at lesser purities. In powder form, zirconium is highly flammable, but the solid form is much less prone to ignition. Zirconium is highly resistant to corrosion by alkalis, acids, salt water, and other agents. However, it will dissolve in hydrochloric and sulfuric acid, especially when fluorine is present. Alloys with zinc are magnetic at less than 35 K.

The melting point of zirconium is 1855 °C (3371 °F), and the boiling point is 4409 °C (7968 °F). Zirconium has an electronegativity of 1.33 on the Pauling scale. Of the elements within the d-block with known electronegativities, zirconium has the fourth lowest electronegativity after hafnium, yttrium, and lutetium.

At room temperature zirconium exhibits a hexagonally close-packed crystal structure, α-Zr, which changes to β-Zr, a body-centered cubic crystal structure, at 863 °C. Zirconium exists in the β-phase until the melting point.

=== Isotopes ===
Naturally occurring zirconium is composed of five isotopes. ^{90}Zr, ^{91}Zr, ^{92}Zr, ^{94}Zr, and ^{96}Zr. The first four are stable, while ^{96}Zr is observed to decay with a half-life of 2.34×10^{19} years by double beta emission; this is theoretically possible also for ^{94}Zr. Of these natural isotopes, ^{90}Zr is the most common, making up 51.45% of all zirconium, and ^{96}Zr is the least common, comprising only 2.80%.

The artificial radioisotopes of zirconium known range from ^{77}Zr to ^{114}Zr, and 13 nuclear isomers are also listed. The most stable among them is ^{93}Zr, a long-lived fission product, with a half-life of 1.61 million years. Radioactive isotopes at or above mass number 93 decay by electron emission resulting in niobium isotopes, whereas those at or below 89 decay by positron emission or electron capture, resulting in yttrium isotopes.

=== Occurrence ===
World production trend of zirconium mineral concentrates

Zirconium has a concentration of about 130 mg/kg within the Earth's crust and about 0.026 μg/L in sea water. It is the 18th most abundant element in the crust. It is not found in nature as a native metal, reflecting its intrinsic instability with respect to water. The principal commercial source of zirconium is zircon (ZrSiO_{4}), a silicate mineral, which is found primarily in Australia, Brazil, India, Russia, South Africa and the United States, as well as in smaller deposits around the world. As of 2023, Australia and South Africa are the leading producers, together accounting for approximately half of global zircon production. Zircon resources exceed 60 million tonnes worldwide and annual worldwide zirconium production is approximately 900,000 tonnes. Zirconium also occurs in more than 140 other minerals, including the commercially useful ores baddeleyite and eudialyte.

Zirconium is relatively abundant in S-type stars, and has been detected in the sun and in meteorites. Lunar rock samples brought back from several Apollo missions to the moon have a high zirconium oxide content relative to terrestrial rocks.

EPR spectroscopy has been used in investigations of the unusual 3+ valence state of zirconium. The EPR spectrum of Zr^{3+}, which has been initially observed as a parasitic signal in Fe‐doped single crystals of ScPO_{4}, was definitively identified by preparing single crystals of ScPO_{4} doped with isotopically enriched (94.6%)^{91}Zr. Single crystals of LuPO_{4} and YPO_{4} doped with both naturally abundant and isotopically enriched Zr have also been grown and investigated.

== Production ==
Zirconium and hafnium production

=== Occurrence ===
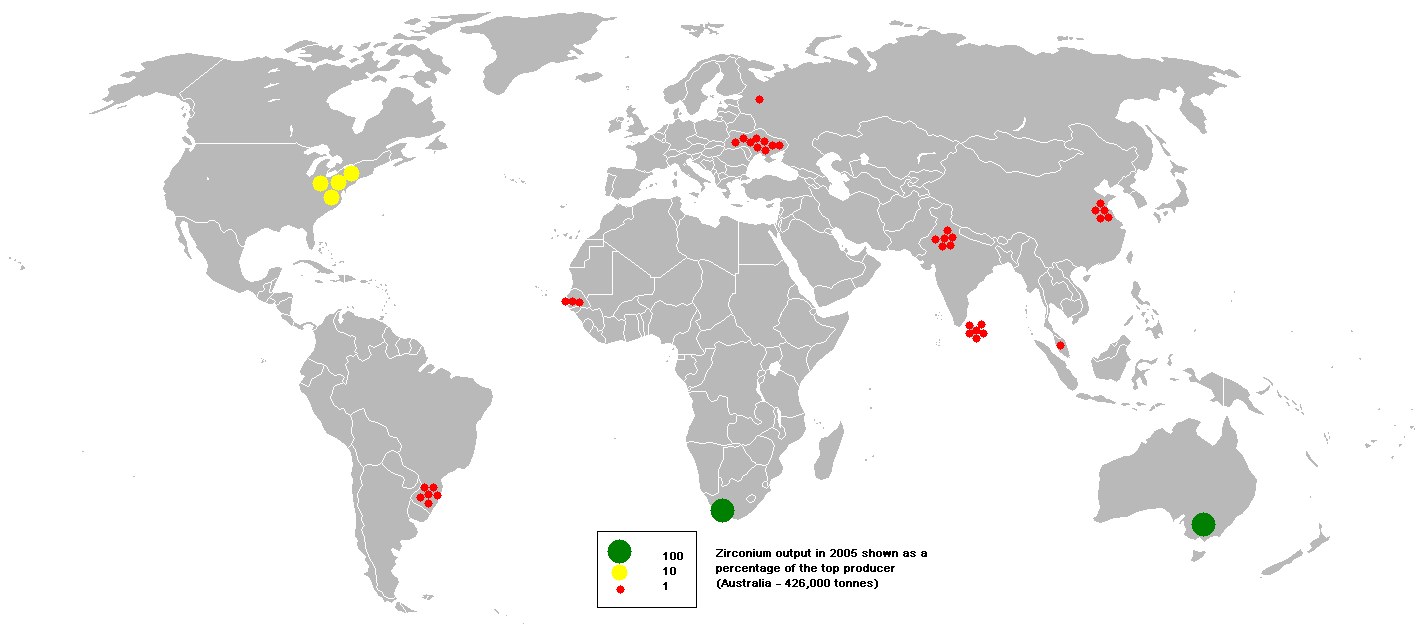
Zirconium output in 2005

Zirconium is a by-product formed after mining and processing of the titanium minerals ilmenite and rutile, as well as tin mining. From 2003 to 2007, while prices for the mineral zircon steadily increased from $360 to $840 per tonne, the price for unwrought zirconium metal decreased from $39,900 to $22,700 per ton. Zirconium metal is much more expensive than zircon because the reduction processes are costly.

Collected from coastal waters, zircon-bearing sand is purified by spiral concentrators to separate lighter materials, which are then returned to the water because they are natural components of beach sand. Using magnetic separation, the titanium ores ilmenite and rutile are removed.

Most zircon is used directly in commercial applications, but a small percentage is converted to the metal. Most Zr metal is produced by the reduction of the zirconium(IV) chloride with magnesium metal in the Kroll process. The resulting metal is sintered until sufficiently ductile for metalworking.

=== Separation of zirconium and hafnium ===
Commercial zirconium metal typically contains 1–3% of hafnium, which is usually not problematic because the chemical properties of hafnium and zirconium are very similar. Their neutron-absorbing properties differ strongly, however, necessitating the separation of hafnium from zirconium for nuclear reactors. Several separation schemes are in use. The liquid–liquid extraction of the thiocyanate-oxide derivatives exploits the fact that the hafnium derivative is slightly more soluble in methyl isobutyl ketone than in water. This method accounts for roughly two-thirds of pure zirconium production, though other methods are being researched; for instance, in India, a TBP-nitrate solvent extraction process is used for the separation of zirconium from other metals. Zr and Hf can also be separated by fractional crystallization of potassium hexafluorozirconate (K_{2}ZrF_{6}), which is less soluble in water than the analogous hafnium derivative. Fractional distillation of the tetrachlorides, also called extractive distillation, is also used.

Vacuum arc melting, combined with the use of hot extruding techniques and supercooled copper hearths, is capable of producing zirconium that has been purified of oxygen, nitrogen, and carbon.

Hafnium must be removed from zirconium for nuclear applications because hafnium has a neutron absorption cross-section 600 times greater than zirconium. The separated hafnium can be used for reactor control rods.

== Compounds ==
Like other transition metals, zirconium forms a wide range of inorganic compounds and coordination complexes. In general, these compounds are colourless diamagnetic solids wherein zirconium has the oxidation state +4. Some organometallic compounds are considered to have Zr(II) oxidation state. Non-equilibrium oxidation states between 0 and 4 have been detected during zirconium oxidation.

=== Oxides, nitrides, and carbides ===
The most common oxide is zirconium dioxide, ZrO_{2}, also known as zirconia. This clear to white-coloured solid has exceptional fracture toughness (for a ceramic) and chemical resistance, especially in its cubic form. These properties make zirconia useful as a thermal barrier coating, although it is also a common diamond substitute. Zirconium monoxide, ZrO, is also known and S-type stars are recognised by detection of its emission lines.

Zirconium tungstate has the unusual property of shrinking in all dimensions when heated, whereas most other substances expand when heated. Zirconyl chloride is one of the few water-soluble zirconium complexes, with the formula [Zr_{4}(OH)_{12}(H_{2}O)_{16}]Cl_{8}.

Zirconium carbide and zirconium nitride are refractory solids. Both are highly corrosion-resistant and find uses in high-temperature resistant coatings and cutting tools. Zirconium hydride phases are known to form when zirconium alloys are exposed to large quantities of hydrogen over time; due to the brittleness of zirconium hydrides relative to zirconium alloys, the mitigation of zirconium hydride formation was highly studied during the development of the first commercial nuclear reactors, in which zirconium carbide was a frequently used material.

Lead zirconate titanate (PZT) is the most commonly used piezoelectric material, being used as transducers and actuators in medical and microelectromechanical systems applications.

=== Halides and pseudohalides ===
All four common halides are known, ZrF_{4}, ZrCl_{4}, ZrBr_{4}, and ZrI_{4}. All have polymeric structures and are far less volatile than the corresponding titanium tetrahalides; they find applications in the formation of organic complexes such as zirconocene dichloride. All tend to hydrolyse to give the so-called oxyhalides and dioxides.

Fusion of the tetrahalides with additional metal gives lower zirconium halides (e.g. ZrCl_{3}). These adopt a layered structure, conducting within the layers but not perpendicular thereto.

The corresponding tetraalkoxides are also known. Unlike the halides, the alkoxides dissolve in nonpolar solvents. Dihydrogen hexafluorozirconate is used in the metal finishing industry as an etching agent to promote paint adhesion.

=== Organic derivatives ===
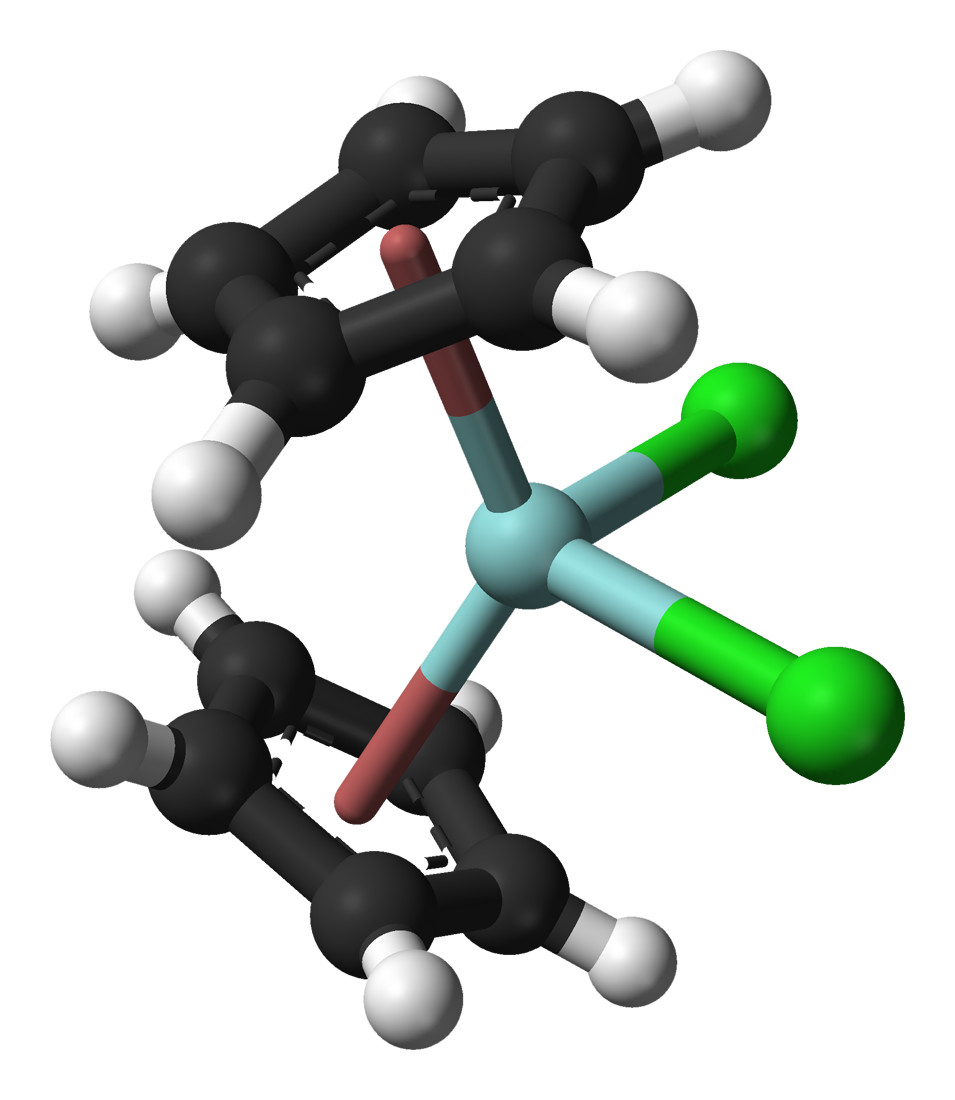
Zirconocene dichloride, a representative organozirconium compound

Organozirconium chemistry is key to Ziegler–Natta catalysts, used to produce polypropylene. This application exploits the ability of zirconium to reversibly form bonds to carbon. Zirconocene dibromide ((C_{5}H_{5})_{2}ZrBr_{2}), reported in 1952 by Birmingham and Wilkinson, was the first organozirconium compound. Schwartz's reagent, prepared in 1970 by P. C. Wailes and H. Weigold, is a metallocene used in organic synthesis for transformations of alkenes and alkynes.

Many complexes of Zr(II) are derivatives of zirconocene, one example being (C_{5}Me_{5})_{2}Zr(CO)_{2}.

== History ==
The zirconium-containing mineral zircon and related minerals (jargoon, jacinth, or hyacinth, ligure) were mentioned in biblical writings. The mineral was not known to contain a new element until 1789, when Klaproth analyzed a jargoon from the island of Ceylon (now Sri Lanka). He named the new element Zirkonerde (zirconia), related to the Persian zargun (zircon; zar-gun, "gold-like" or "as gold"). Humphry Davy attempted to isolate this new element in 1808 through electrolysis, but failed. Zirconium metal was first obtained in an impure form in 1824 by Berzelius by heating a mixture of potassium and potassium zirconium fluoride in an iron tube.

The crystal bar process (also known as the Iodide Process), discovered by Anton Eduard van Arkel and Jan Hendrik de Boer in 1925, was the first industrial process for the commercial production of metallic zirconium. It involves the formation and subsequent thermal decomposition of zirconium tetraiodide (ZrI_{4}), and was superseded in 1945 by the much cheaper Kroll process developed by William Justin Kroll, in which zirconium tetrachloride (ZrCl_{4}) is reduced by magnesium:

ZrCl_{4} + 2 Mg → Zr + 2 MgCl_{2}

== Applications ==
Approximately 900,000 tonnes of zirconium ores were mined in 1995, mostly as zircon.

Most zircon is used directly in high-temperature applications. Because it is refractory, hard, and resistant to chemical attack, zircon finds many applications. Its main use is as an opacifier, conferring a white, opaque appearance to ceramic materials. Because of its chemical resistance, zircon is also used in aggressive environments, such as moulds for molten metals.

Zirconium dioxide (ZrO_{2}) is used in laboratory crucibles, in metallurgical furnaces, and as a refractory material Because it is mechanically strong and flexible, it can be sintered into ceramic knives and other blades. Zircon (ZrSiO_{4}) and cubic zirconia (ZrO_{2}) are cut into gemstones for use in jewelry. Zirconium dioxide is a component in some abrasives, such as grinding wheels and sandpaper. Zircon is also used in dating of rocks from about the time of the Earth's formation through the measurement of its inherent radioisotopes, most often uranium and lead.

A small fraction of the zircon is converted to the metal, which finds various niche applications. Because of zirconium's excellent resistance to corrosion, it is often used as an alloying agent in materials that are exposed to aggressive environments, such as surgical appliances, light filaments, and watch cases. The high reactivity of zirconium with oxygen at high temperatures is exploited in some specialised applications such as explosive primers and as getters in vacuum tubes. Zirconium powder is used as a degassing agent in electron tubes, while zirconium wire and sheets are utilized for grid and anode supports. Burning zirconium was used as a light source in some photographic flashbulbs. Zirconium powder with a mesh size from 10 to 80 is occasionally used in pyrotechnic compositions to generate sparks. The high reactivity of zirconium leads to bright white sparks.

=== Nuclear applications ===
Cladding for nuclear reactor fuels consumes about 1% of the zirconium supply, mainly in the form of zircaloys. The desired properties of these alloys are a low neutron-capture cross-section and resistance to corrosion under normal service conditions. Efficient methods for removing the hafnium impurities were developed to serve this purpose.

One disadvantage of zirconium alloys is the reactivity with water, producing hydrogen, leading to degradation of the fuel rod cladding:

Zr + 2 H_{2}O → ZrO_{2} + 2 H_{2}

Hydrolysis is very slow below 100 °C, but rapid at temperature above 900 °C. Most metals undergo similar reactions. The redox reaction is relevant to the instability of fuel assemblies at high temperatures. This reaction occurred in the reactors 1, 2 and 3 of the Fukushima I Nuclear Power Plant (Japan) after the reactor cooling was interrupted by the earthquake and tsunami disaster of March 11, 2011, leading to the Fukushima I nuclear accidents. After venting the hydrogen in the maintenance hall of those three reactors, the mixture of hydrogen with atmospheric oxygen exploded, severely damaging the installations and at least one of the containment buildings.

Zirconium is a constituent of uranium zirconium hydrides, nuclear fuels used in research reactors.

=== Space and aeronautic industries ===
Materials fabricated from zirconium metal and ZrO_{2} are used in space vehicles where resistance to heat is needed.

High temperature parts such as combustors, blades, and vanes in jet engines and stationary gas turbines are increasingly being protected by thin ceramic layers and/or paintable coatings, usually composed of a mixture of zirconia and yttria.

Zirconium is also used as a material of first choice for hydrogen peroxide (H_{2}O_{2}) tanks, propellant lines, valves, and thrusters, in propulsion space systems such as these equipping the Sierra Space's Dream Chaser spaceplane where the thrust is provided by the combustion of kerosene and hydrogen peroxide, a powerful, but unstable, oxidizer. The reason is that zirconium has an excellent corrosion resistance to H_{2}O_{2} and, above all, does not catalyse its spontaneous self-decomposition as the ions of many transition metals do.

=== Medical uses ===
Zirconium-bearing compounds are used in many biomedical applications, including dental implants and crowns, knee and hip replacements, middle-ear ossicular chain reconstruction, and other restorative and prosthetic devices.

Zirconium binds to urea, a property that has been utilized extensively to the benefit of patients with chronic kidney disease. For example, zirconium is a primary component of the sorbent column dependent dialysate regeneration and recirculation system known as the REDY system, which was first introduced in 1973. More than 2,000,000 dialysis treatments have been performed using the sorbent column in the REDY system. Although the REDY system was superseded in the 1990s by less expensive alternatives, new sorbent-based dialysis systems are being evaluated and approved by the U.S. Food and Drug Administration (FDA). Renal Solutions developed the DIALISORB technology, a portable, low water dialysis system. Also, developmental versions of a Wearable Artificial Kidney have incorporated sorbent-based technologies.

Sodium zirconium cyclosilicate is used by mouth in the treatment of hyperkalemia. It is a selective sorbent designed to trap potassium ions in preference to other ions throughout the gastrointestinal tract.

Mixtures of monomeric and polymeric Zr^{4+} and Al^{3+} complexes with hydroxide, chloride and glycine, called aluminium zirconium glycine salts, are used in a preparation as an antiperspirant in many deodorant products. It has been used since the early 1960s, as it was determined more efficacious as an antiperspirant than contemporary active ingredients such as aluminium chlorohydrate.

=== Defunct applications ===
Zirconium carbonate (3ZrO_{2}·CO_{2}·H_{2}O) was used in lotions to treat poison ivy but was discontinued because it occasionally caused skin reactions.

Zirconium foil was used in photography in the 1960s as a filler for some incandescent flash bulbs (Sylvania M25, General Electric M5, Philips PF5...), instead of the usual aluminium foil, with a higher lumen output and a faster peak time.

== Safety ==
Zirconium
Hazards
NFPA 704 (fire diamond)	0 1 0

Although zirconium has no known biological role, the human body contains, on average, 250 milligrams of zirconium, and daily intake is approximately 4.15 milligrams (3.5 milligrams from food and 0.65 milligrams from water), depending on dietary habits. Zirconium is widely distributed in nature and is found in all biological systems, for example: 2.86 μg/g in whole wheat, 3.09 μg/g in brown rice, 0.55 μg/g in spinach, 1.23 μg/g in eggs, and 0.86 μg/g in ground beef. Further, zirconium is commonly used in commercial products (e.g. deodorant sticks, aerosol antiperspirants) and also in water purification (e.g. control of phosphorus pollution, bacteria- and pyrogen-contaminated water).

Short-term exposure to zirconium powder can cause irritation, but only contact with the eyes requires medical attention. Persistent exposure to zirconium tetrachloride results in increased mortality in rats and guinea pigs and a decrease of blood hemoglobin and red blood cells in dogs. However, in a study of 20 rats given a standard diet containing ~4% zirconium oxide, there were no adverse effects on growth rate, blood and urine parameters, or mortality. The U.S. Occupational Safety and Health Administration (OSHA) legal limit (permissible exposure limit) for zirconium exposure is 5 mg/m^{3} over an 8-hour workday. The National Institute for Occupational Safety and Health (NIOSH) recommended exposure limit (REL) is 5 mg/m^{3} over an 8-hour workday and a short term limit of 10 mg/m^{3}. At levels of 25 mg/m^{3}, zirconium is immediately dangerous to life and health. However, zirconium is not considered an industrial health hazard. Furthermore, reports of zirconium-related adverse reactions are rare and, in general, rigorous cause-and-effect relationships have not been established. No evidence has been validated that zirconium is carcinogenic or genotoxic.

Among the numerous radioactive isotopes of zirconium, ^{93}Zr is among the most common. It is released as a product of nuclear fission of ^{235}U and ^{239}Pu, mainly in nuclear power plants and during nuclear weapons tests in the 1950s and 1960s. It has a very long half-life (1.53 million years), its decay emits only low energy radiations, and it is not considered particularly hazardous.

== See also ==
- Zirconium alloys
- Zirconia light
