= Zirconium(III) chloride =

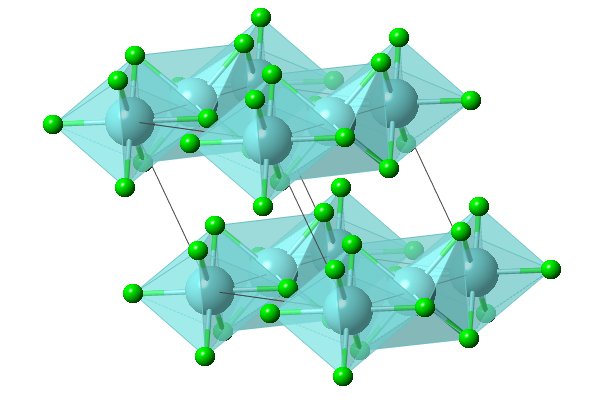
- 3D model of zirconium(III) chloride

Names
- IUPAC name Zirconium trichloride

Identifiers
CAS Number	10241-03-9
3D model (JSmol)	Interactive image
ChemSpider	127679
PubChem CID	144719
CompTox Dashboard (EPA)	DTXSID101029428
- InChI: InChI=1S/3ClH.Zr/h3*1H;/q;;;+3/p-3 Key: PFXYQVJESZAMSV-UHFFFAOYSA-K
- SMILES: Cl[Zr](Cl)Cl

Properties
Chemical formula	Cl_{3}Zr
Molar mass	197.57 g·mol^{−1}
Appearance	Blue-black crystals
Density	3.05 g/cm^{3}
Melting point	627 °C (1,161 °F; 900 K) at 760 mmHg
Solubility in water	Reacts
Solubility	Soluble in benzene, CS_{2}

Structure
Crystal structure	Hexagonal, hP6
Space group	P6_{3}/mcm, No. 193
Point group	6/m 2/m 2/m
Lattice constant	a = 6.36 Å, c = 6.14 Å α = 90°, β = 90°, γ = 120°

Thermochemistry
Heat capacity (C)	96.21 J/mol·K
Std molar entropy (S^{⦵}_{298})	145.79 J/mol·K
Std enthalpy of formation (Δ_{f}H^{⦵}_{298})	−714.21 kJ/mol

Related compounds
Other anions	Zirconium(III) bromide Zirconium(III) iodide
Other cations	Titanium(III) chloride Hafnium(III) chloride
Related compounds	Zirconium(IV) chloride
- Except where otherwise noted, data are given for materials in their standard state (at 25 °C [77 °F], 100 kPa). verify (what is ?) Infobox references

Zirconium(III) chloride is an inorganic compound with formula ZrCl_{3}. It is a blue-black solid that is highly sensitive to air.

== Preparation ==
The material was first claimed by Ruff and Wallstein who reduced zirconium tetrachloride with aluminium to give impure samples. Subsequently, the problem with aluminium contamination was solved when it was prepared by reduction using zirconium metal:

Zr + 3 ZrCl_{4} → 4 ZrCl_{3}

When aluminium is used as the reducing agent with zirconium tetrachloride, a series of choloroaluminates are formed, for example [Zr(AlCl_{4})_{2}(AlCl_{4})_{2}] and Zr(AlCl_{4})_{3}.

Since the trihalides, such as zirconium trichloride, are comparatively nonvolatile, contamination can be avoided by using a gaseous reductant. For example, zirconium trichloride can be prepared by reduction of zirconium tetrachloride with hydrogen.

ZrCl_{4} + ½ H_{2} → ZrCl_{3} + HCl

== Structure ==
Some zirconium halides (ZrCl_{3}, ZrBr_{3}, and ZrI_{3}) have structures similar to HfI_{3}. They also have similar space group (P6_{3}/mcm) and hexagonal structure with 2 molecules in the cell. The magnetic susceptibility of zirconium trichloride suggests metal-metal interactions of the unpaired electron on each Zr(III) center. The magnetic moment of ZrCl_{3} (0.4 BM) indicates considerable overlap of metal orbitals.
