= Zirconium tetrafluoride =

Zirconium(IV) fluoride
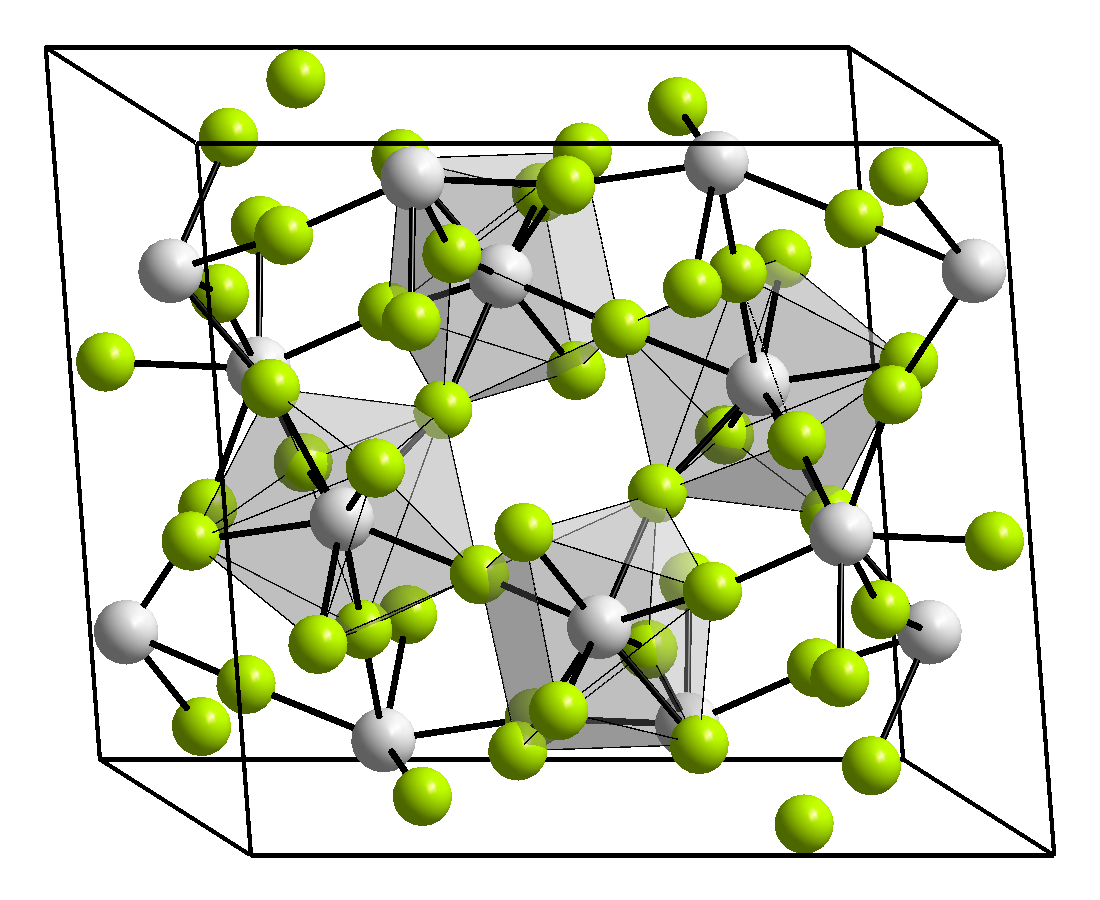
- Zirconium(IV) fluoride

Names
- IUPAC names Zirconium(IV) fluoride Zirconium tetrafluoride

Identifiers
| CAS Number | 7783-64-4; 15298-38-1 (monohydrate) |
| 3D model (JSmol) | Interactive image |
| ChemSpider | 74196 |
| ECHA InfoCard | 100.029.107 |
| EC Number | 232-018-1 |
| PubChem CID | 82216 |
| UNII | 1XHF39056H |
| CompTox Dashboard (EPA) | DTXSID5064831 |
- InChI: InChI=1S/4FH.Zr/h4*1H;/q;;;;+4/p-4 Key: OMQSJNWFFJOIMO-UHFFFAOYSA-J; InChI=1/4FH.Zr/h4*1H;/q;;;;+4/p-4 Key: OMQSJNWFFJOIMO-XBHQNQODAN
- SMILES: F[Zr](F)(F)F

Properties
| Chemical formula | ZrF_{4} |
| Molar mass | 167.21 g/mol |
| Appearance | white crystalline powder |
| Density | 4.43 g/cm^{3} (20 °C) |
| Melting point | 910 °C (1,670 °F; 1,180 K) |
| Solubility in water | 1.32 g/100mL (20 °C); 1.388 g/100mL (25 °C) |

Structure
| Crystal structure | Monoclinic, mS60 |
| Space group | C12/c1, No. 15 |

Hazards
- GHS labelling
| Pictograms | (GHS05: Corrosive) |
| Signal word | Danger |
| Hazard statements | H314 |
| Precautionary statements | P260, P264, P280, P301+P330+P331, P302+P361+P354, P304+P340, P305+P354+P338, P316, P321, P363, P405, P501 |
| Flash point | Non-flammable |
- Lethal dose or concentration (LD, LC)
| LD_{50} (median dose) | 98 mg/kg (oral, mouse); 98 mg/kg (oral, rat) |

Related compounds
| Other anions | Zirconium(IV) chloride Zirconium(IV) bromide Zirconium(IV) iodide |
| Other cations | Titanium(IV) fluoride Hafnium(IV) fluoride |
- Except where otherwise noted, data are given for materials in their standard state (at 25 °C [77 °F], 100 kPa). verify (what is ?) Infobox references

Zirconium(IV) fluoride describes members of a family inorganic compounds with the formula ZrF_{4}(H_{2}O)_{x}. All are colorless, diamagnetic solids. Anhydrous Zirconium(IV) fluoride is a component of ZBLAN fluoride glass.

== Structure ==
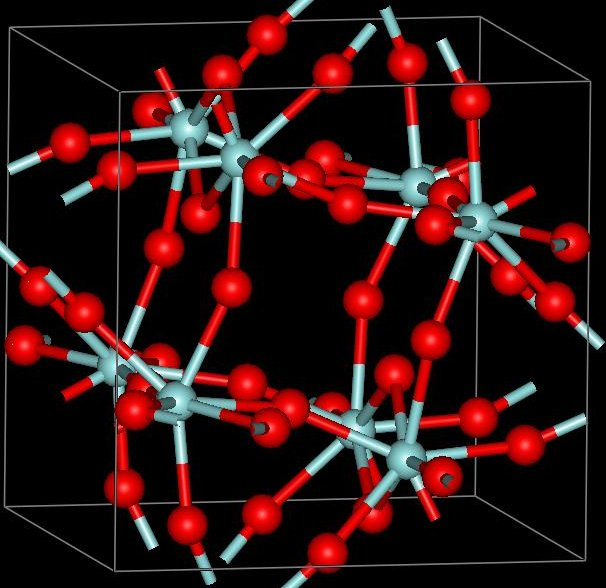
Tetragonal ZrF_{4}

Three crystalline phases of ZrF_{4} have been reported, the stable β phase (monoclinic, space group I2/c), α (tetragonal, space group P4_{2}/m) which is a high-temperature meta-stable form that can be stabilized by quenching. The γ-form (monoclinic, space group P2_{1}/c) is a high-pressure phase, forming at pressures between (4-8 GPa). α and γ phases are unstable and transform into the β phase at 400 and 723 °C respectively. There also exists an amorphous phase.

Zirconium(IV) fluoride forms several hydrates. The trihydrate has the structure (μ−F)_{2}[ZrF_{3}(H_{2}O)_{3}]_{2}.

== Preparation and reactions ==
Zirconium fluoride can be produced by several methods. Zirconium dioxide reacts with hydrogen fluoride and hydrofluoric acid to afford the anhydrous and monohydrates:

ZrO_{2} + 4 HF → ZrF_{4} + 2 H_{2}O

The reaction of Zr metal reacts at high temperatures with HF as well:

Zr + 4 HF → ZrF_{4} + 2 H_{2}

Zirconium dioxide reacts at 200 °C with solid ammonium bifluoride to give the heptafluorozirconate salt, which can be converted to the tetrafluoride at 500 °C:

2ZrO_{2} + 7 (NH_{4})HF_{2} → 2 (NH_{4})_{3}ZrF_{7} + 4 H_{2}O + NH_{3}
(NH_{4})_{3}ZrF_{7} → ZrF_{4} + 3 HF + 3 NH_{3}

Addition of hydrofluoric acid to solutions of zirconium nitrate precipitates solid monohydrate. Hydrates of zirconium tetrafluoride can be dehydrated by heating under a stream of hydrogen fluoride.

Zirconium fluoride can be purified by distillation or sublimation.

Zirconium fluoride forms double salts with other fluorides. The most prominent is potassium hexafluorozirconate, formed by fusion of potassium fluoride and zirconium tetrafluoride:

ZrF_{4} + 2 KF → K_{2}ZrF_{6}

== Applications ==
The major and perhaps only commercial application of zirconium fluoride is as a precursor to ZBLAN glasses.

Mixture of sodium fluoride, zirconium fluoride, and uranium tetrafluoride (53-41-6 mol.%) was used as a coolant in the Aircraft Reactor Experiment. A mixture of lithium fluoride, beryllium fluoride, zirconium fluoride, and uranium-233 tetrafluoride was used in the Molten-Salt Reactor Experiment. (Uranium-233 is used in the thorium fuel cycle reactors.)
