= Jargoon =

Light-colored zircon variety

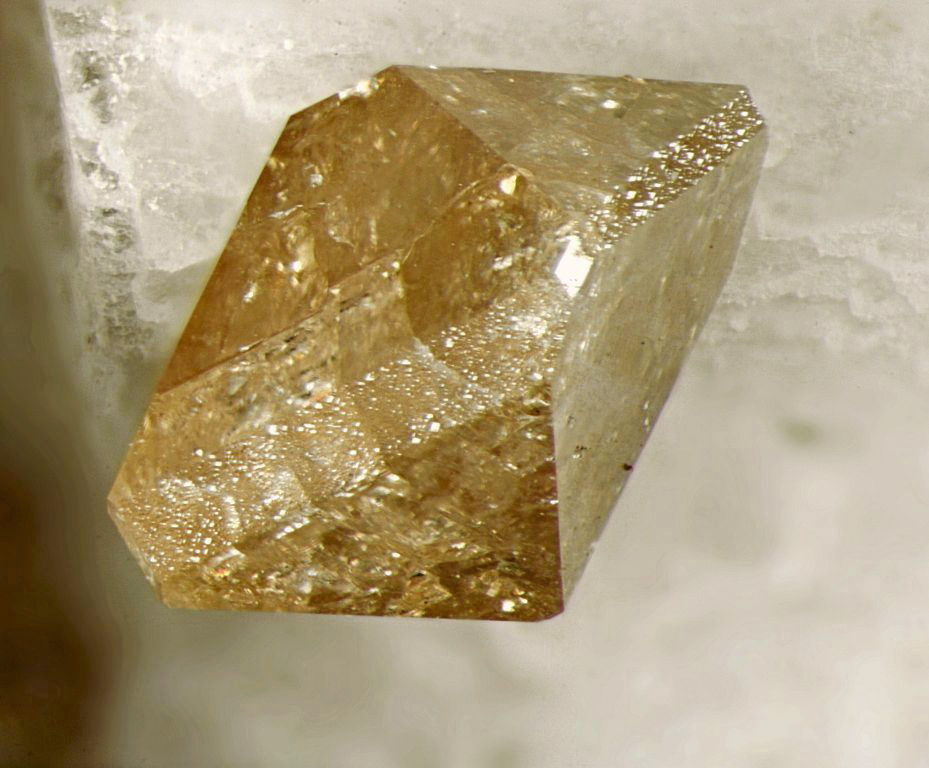
Zircon (FOV 3.0 × 2.4 mm) from Mont Saint-Hilaire, Canada

Jargoon or jargon (occasionally in old writings jargounce and jacounce) is a name applied by gemologists to zircons that are of sufficient quality to be cut as gemstones, but not the red color that characterizes the hyacinth or jacinth. The word is related to Persian zargun (zircon; zar-gun, "gold-like" or "as gold").

Some of the finest jargoons are green, others brown and yellow, while some are colorless. The colorless jargoon may be obtained by heating certain colored stones. When zircon is heated it sometimes changes color, or loses it, and at the same time usually increases in density and brilliancy. The so-called Matura diamonds, formerly sent from Matara (or Matura) in Sri Lanka, were decolorized zircons.

The zircon has strong refractive power, and its lustre approaches adamantine, but it lacks the fire of diamond. The specific gravity of zircon is subject to variation in different varieties; thus Sir A. H. Church found the specific gravity of a fine leaf-green jargoon to be as low as 3.982, and that of a pure white jargoon as high as 4.705. Jargoon and tourmaline, when cut as gems, are sometimes mistaken for each other, but the specific gravity is distinctive, since tourmaline is only 3.103. Moreover, in tourmaline the dichroism is strongly marked, whereas in jargoon it is feeble. The refractive indices of jargoon are much higher than those of tourmaline.

== Sources ==
- Kunz: Gems and Precious stones of North America; Zircon
