= Zirconium(IV) bromide =

Names
- Other names zirconium tetrabromide

Identifiers
CAS Number	13777-25-8
3D model (JSmol)	Interactive image
ChemSpider	75549
ECHA InfoCard	100.034.002
EC Number	237-417-4
PubChem CID	83727
CompTox Dashboard (EPA)	DTXSID6065630
- InChI: InChI=1S/4BrH.Zr/h4*1H;/q;;;;+4/p-4 Key: LSWWNKUULMMMIL-UHFFFAOYSA-J; InChI=1/4BrH.Zr/h4*1H;/q;;;;+4/p-4 Key: LSWWNKUULMMMIL-XBHQNQODAM
- SMILES: Br[Zr](Br)(Br)Br

Properties
Chemical formula	ZrBr_{4}
Molar mass	410.86 g/mol
Appearance	off-white powder
Density	4.201 g/cm^{3}, solid
Melting point	450 °C (842 °F; 723 K)
Boiling point	sublimes
Solubility in water	reacts with water

Structure
Crystal structure	Cubic, cP40
Space group	P-43m, No. 205

Hazards
- GHS labelling
Pictograms	(GHS05: Corrosive)
Signal word	Danger
Hazard statements	H314
Precautionary statements	P260, P264, P280, P301+P330+P331, P303+P361+P353, P304+P340, P305+P351+P338, P310, P321, P363, P405, P501
NFPA 704 (fire diamond)	3 0 2

Related compounds
Other anions	Zirconium(IV) fluoride Zirconium(IV) chloride Zirconium(IV) iodide
Other cations	Titanium tetrabromide Hafnium tetrabromide
Related compounds	Zirconium(III) bromide
- Except where otherwise noted, data are given for materials in their standard state (at 25 °C [77 °F], 100 kPa). verify (what is ?) Infobox references

Zirconium(IV) bromide is the inorganic compound with the formula ZrBr_{4}. This colourless solid is the principal precursor to other Zr–Br compounds.

== Preparation and properties ==
ZrBr_{4} is prepared by the action of bromine on zirconium oxide via a carbothermic reaction:

ZrO_{2} + 2 C + 2 Br_{2} → ZrBr_{4} + 2 CO

Like many related tetrahalides, it is purified by sublimation.

It can also be prepared by treatment of the borohydride complex with hydrogen bromide:

Zr(BH_{4})_{4} + 4 HBr → ZrBr_{4} + 4 H_{2} + 2 B_{2}H_{6}

Like related tetrabromides of Ti and Hf, ZrBr_{4} hydrolyzes readily to give the oxybromide, with release of hydrogen bromide.

== Structure ==
No single crystal X-ray study of ZrBr_{4} has been described. Some reports suggest that it is isostructural with TiCl_{4} and TiBr_{4}, featuring tetrahedral metal centers. Other studies indicate a polymeric structure. ZrCl_{4} is polymeric in the solid state, featuring octahedral Zr centers.
