= Zirconium(IV) chloride =

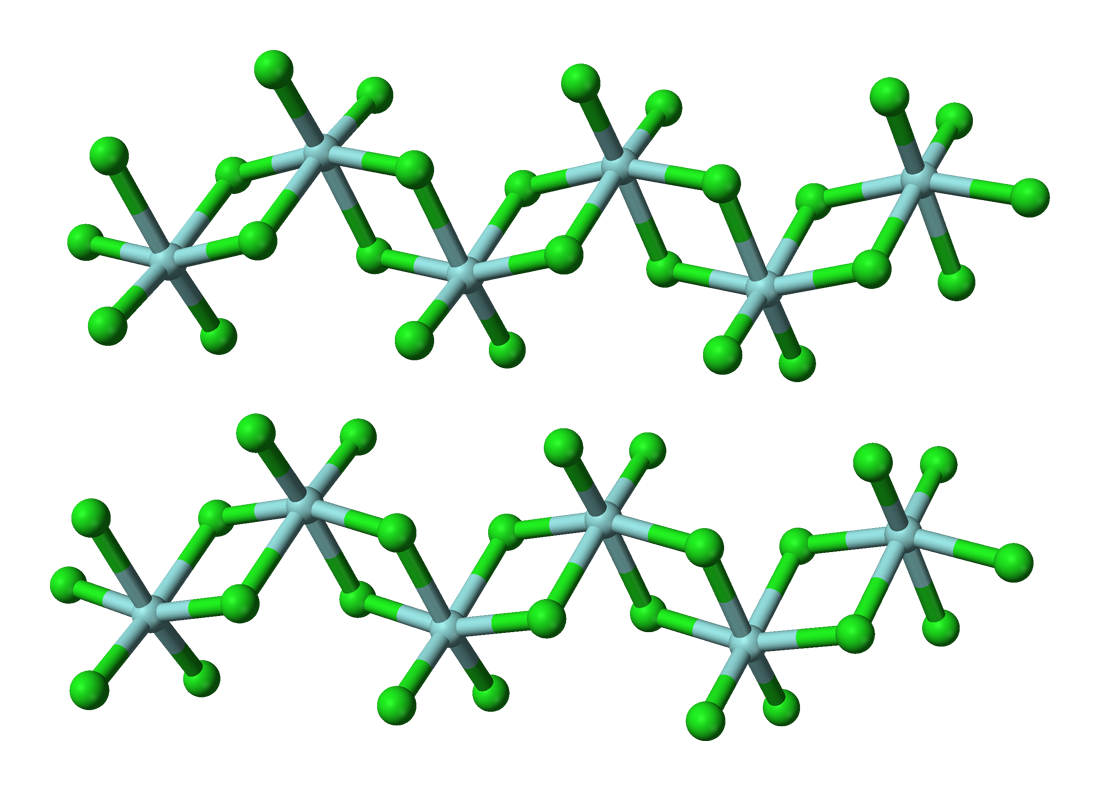

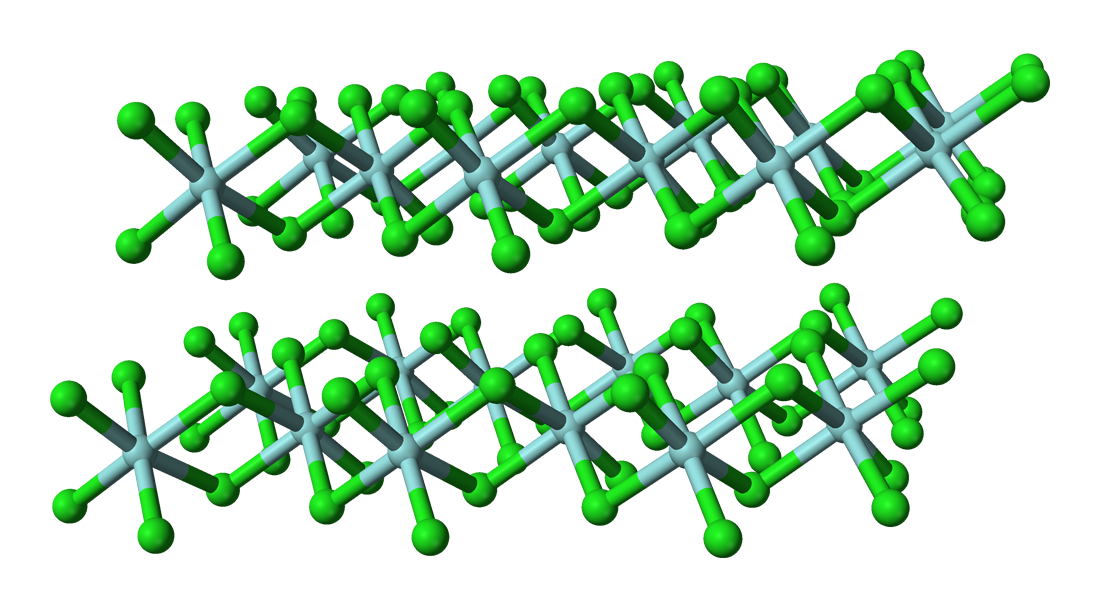

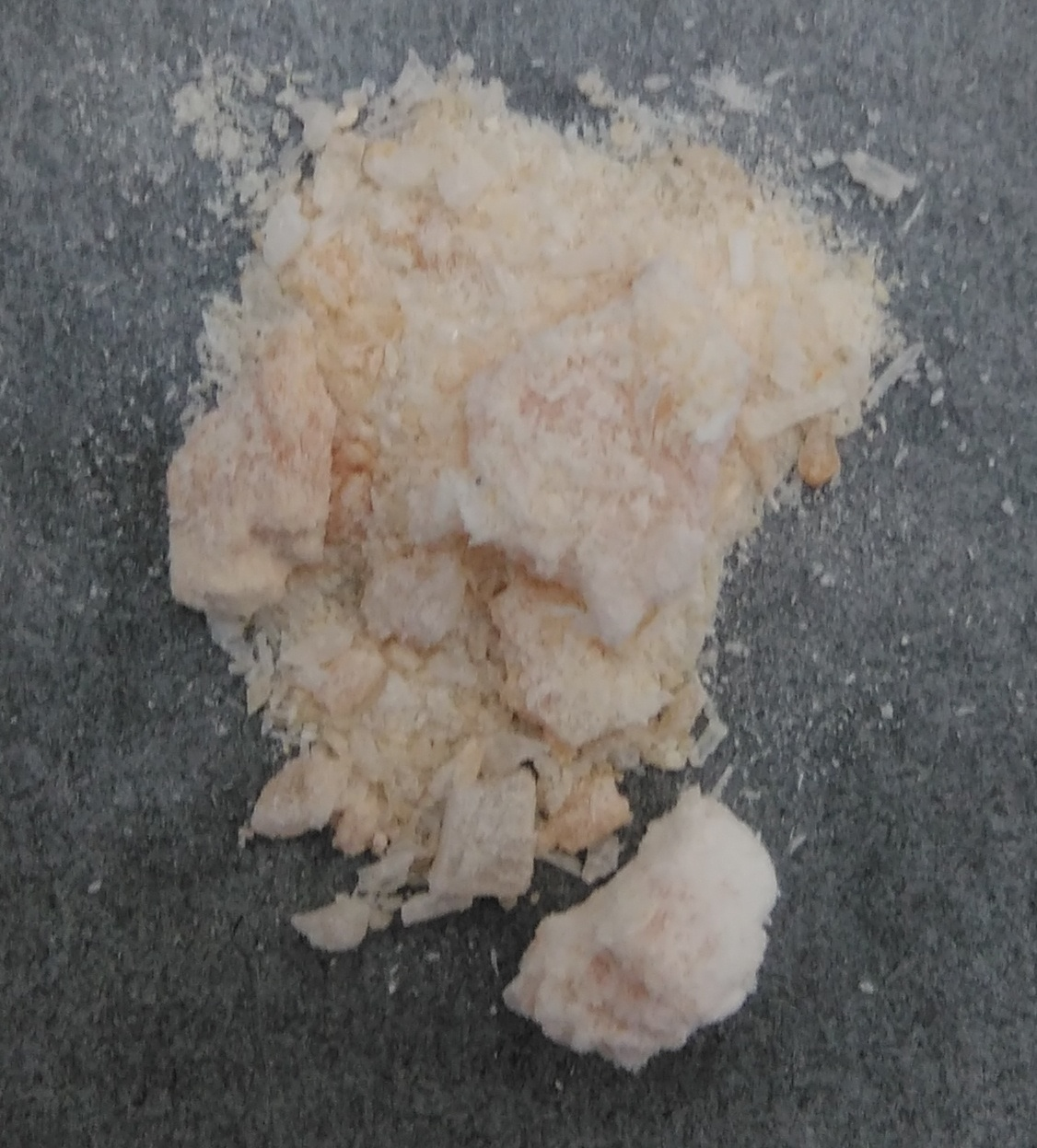

Names
- IUPAC names Zirconium tetrachloride Zirconium(IV) chloride

Identifiers
CAS Number	10026-11-6
3D model (JSmol)	monomer: Interactive image; polymer: Interactive image
ChEBI	CHEBI:77566
ChemSpider	23202
ECHA InfoCard	100.030.041
EC Number	233-058-2
PubChem CID	24817
UNII	Z88176T871
CompTox Dashboard (EPA)	DTXSID1044142
- InChI: InChI=1S/4ClH.Zr/h4*1H;/q;;;;+4/p-4 Key: DUNKXUFBGCUVQW-UHFFFAOYSA-J; InChI=1/4ClH.Zr/h4*1H;/q;;;;+4/p-4 Key: DUNKXUFBGCUVQW-XBHQNQODAQ
- SMILES: monomer: Cl[Zr](Cl)(Cl)Cl; polymer: Cl[Zr-2](Cl)(Cl)(Cl)([Cl+]1)[Cl+][Zr-2]1(Cl)(Cl)([Cl+]1)[Cl+][Zr-2]1(Cl)(Cl)([Cl+]1)[Cl+][Zr-2]1(Cl)(Cl)([Cl+]1)[Cl+][Zr-2]1(Cl)(Cl)([Cl+]1)[Cl+][Zr-2]1(Cl)(Cl)([Cl+]1)[Cl+][Zr-2]1(Cl)(Cl)([Cl+]1)[Cl+][Zr-2]1(Cl)(Cl)([Cl+]1)[Cl+][Zr-2]1(Cl)(Cl)([Cl+]1)[Cl+][Zr-2]1(Cl)(Cl)(Cl)Cl

Properties
Chemical formula	ZrCl_{4}
Molar mass	233.04 g/mol
Appearance	white crystals
Density	2.80 g/cm^{3}
Melting point	437 °C (819 °F; 710 K) (triple point)
Boiling point	331 °C (628 °F; 604 K) (sublimes)
Solubility in water	hydrolysis
Solubility	concentrated HCl (with reaction)

Structure
Crystal structure	Monoclinic, mP10
Space group	P12/c1, No. 13

Thermochemistry
Heat capacity (C)	125.38 J K^{−1} mol^{−1}
Std molar entropy (S^{⦵}_{298})	181.41 J K^{−1} mol^{−1}
Std enthalpy of formation (Δ_{f}H^{⦵}_{298})	−980.52 kJ/mol

Hazards
- GHS labelling
Pictograms	(GHS05: Corrosive) (GHS07: Exclamation mark) (GHS08: Health hazard)
Signal word	Danger
Hazard statements	H290, H302, H312, H314, H317, H332, H334
Precautionary statements	P234, P260, P264, P270, P271, P272, P280, P285, P301+P312, P301+P330+P331, P302+P352, P303+P361+P353, P304+P312, P304+P340, P304+P341, P305+P351+P338, P310, P312, P321, P322, P330, P333+P313, P342+P311, P363, P390, P404, P405, P501
NFPA 704 (fire diamond)	3 0 2 W
Flash point	Non-flammable
- Lethal dose or concentration (LD, LC)
LD_{50} (median dose)	1488-1500 mg/kg (oral, rat); 655 mg/kg (mouse, oral)
Safety data sheet (SDS)	MSDS

Related compounds
Other anions	Zirconium(IV) fluoride Zirconium(IV) bromide Zirconium(IV) iodide
Other cations	Titanium tetrachloride Hafnium tetrachloride
Related compounds	Zirconium(II) chloride, Zirconium(III) chloride
- Except where otherwise noted, data are given for materials in their standard state (at 25 °C [77 °F], 100 kPa). verify (what is ?) Infobox references

Zirconium(IV) chloride, also known as zirconium tetrachloride, (ZrCl_{4}) is an inorganic compound frequently used as a precursor to other compounds of zirconium. This white high-melting solid hydrolyzes rapidly in humid air.

== Structure ==
Unlike molecular TiCl_{4}, solid ZrCl_{4} adopts a polymeric structure wherein each Zr is octahedrally coordinated. This difference in structures is responsible for the disparity in their properties: TiCl_{4} is distillable, but ZrCl_{4} is a solid. In the solid state, ZrCl_{4} adopts a tape-like linear polymeric structure—the same structure adopted by HfCl_{4}. This polymer degrades readily upon treatment with Lewis bases, which cleave the Zr-Cl-Zr linkages.

== Synthesis ==
This conversion entails treatment of zirconium oxide with carbon in the presence of chlorine at high temperature:

ZrO_{2} + 2 C + 2 Cl_{2} → ZrCl_{4} + 2 CO

A laboratory scale process uses carbon tetrachloride in place of carbon and chlorine:

ZrO_{2} + 2 CCl_{4} → ZrCl_{4} + 2 COCl_{2}

== Applications ==
=== Precursor to zirconium metal ===
ZrCl_{4} is an intermediate in the conversion of zirconium minerals to metallic zirconium by the Kroll process. In nature, zirconium minerals usually exist as oxides (reflected also by the tendency of all zirconium chlorides to hydrolyze). For their conversion to bulk metal, these refractory oxides are first converted to the tetrachloride, which can be distilled at high temperatures. The purified ZrCl_{4} can be reduced with Zr metal to produce zirconium(III) chloride.

=== Other uses ===
ZrCl_{4} is the most common precursor for chemical vapor deposition of zirconium dioxide and zirconium diboride.

In organic synthesis zirconium tetrachloride is used as a weak Lewis acid for the Friedel-Crafts reaction, the Diels-Alder reaction and intramolecular cyclisation reactions. It is also used to make water-repellent treatment of textiles and other fibrous materials.

== Properties and reactions ==
Hydrolysis of ZrCl_{4} gives the hydrated hydroxy chloride cluster called zirconyl chloride. This reaction is rapid and virtually irreversible, consistent with the high oxophilicity of zirconium(IV). For this reason, manipulations of ZrCl_{4} typically require air-free techniques.

ZrCl_{4} is the principal starting compound for the synthesis of many organometallic complexes of zirconium. Because of its polymeric structure, ZrCl_{4} is usually converted to a molecular complex before use. It forms a 1:2 complex with tetrahydrofuran: CAS [21959-01-3], mp 175–177 °C. Sodium cyclopentadienide (NaC_{5}H_{5}) reacts with ZrCl_{4}(THF)_{2} to give zirconocene dichloride, ZrCl_{2}(C_{5}H_{5})_{2}, a versatile organozirconium complex. One of the most curious properties of ZrCl_{4} is its high solubility in the presence of methylated benzenes, such as durene. This solubilization arises through the formation of π-complexes.

The log (base 10) of the vapor pressure of zirconium tetrachloride (from 480 to 689 K) is given by the equation: log_{10}(P) = −5400/T + 11.766, where the pressure is measured in torrs and temperature in kelvins. The log (base 10) of the vapor pressure of solid zirconium tetrachloride (from 710 to 741 K) is given by the equation log_{10}(P) = −3427/T + 9.088. The pressure at the melting point is 14,500 torrs.
