= Titanium(III) chloride =

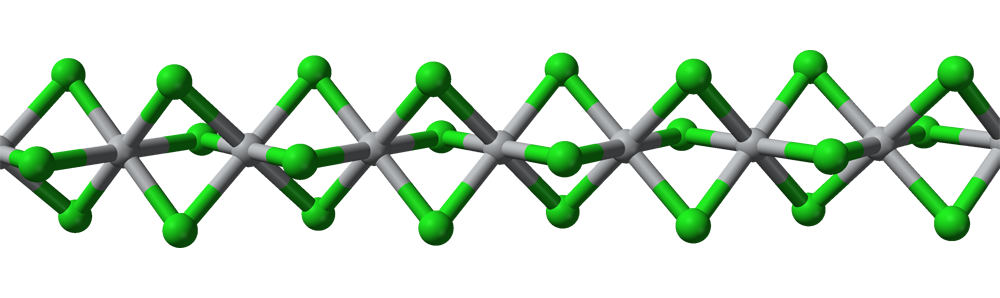

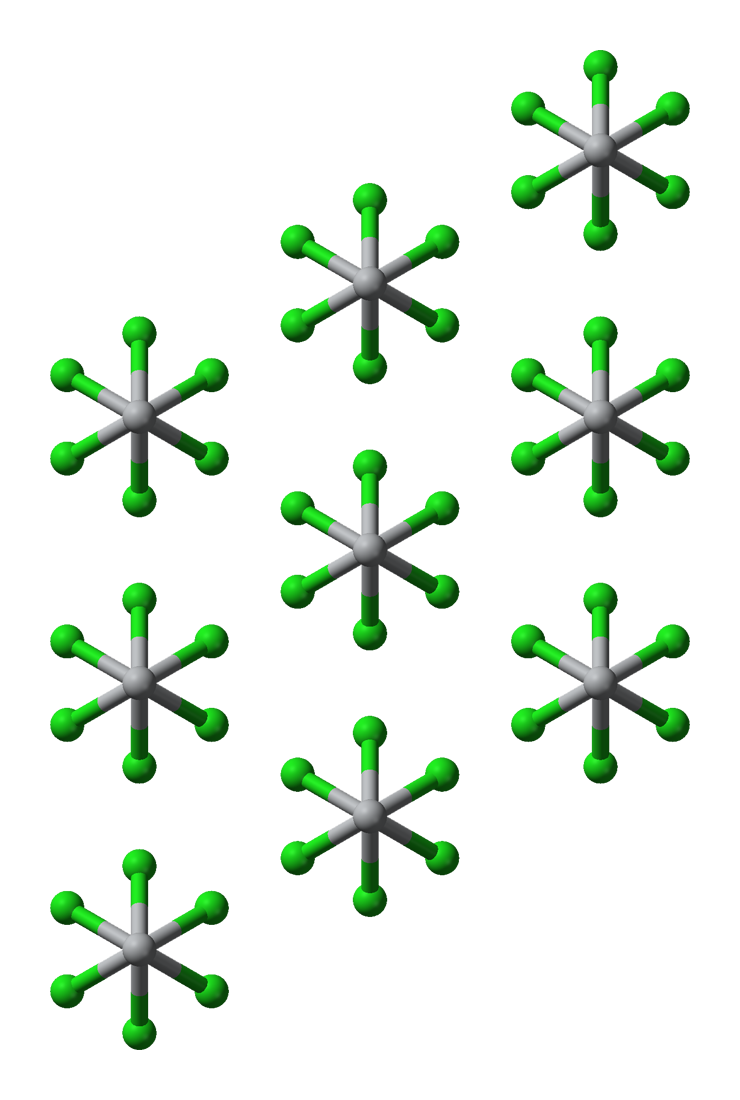
β-TiCl_{3} viewed along the chains
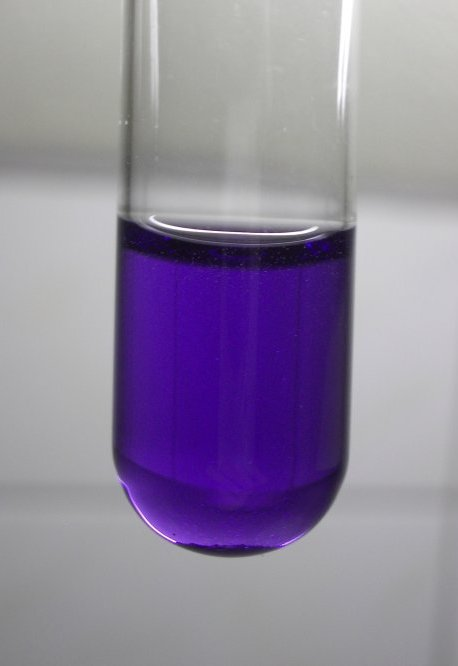
TiCl_{3} solution

Names
- Other names titanium trichloride titanous chloride

Identifiers
CAS Number	7705-07-9
3D model (JSmol)	Interactive image
ChemSpider	56398
ECHA InfoCard	100.028.845
EC Number	231-728-9
PubChem CID	62646
RTECS number	XR1924000
UNII	GVD566MM7K
CompTox Dashboard (EPA)	DTXSID1052870
- InChI: InChI=1S/3ClH.Ti/h3*1H;/q;;;+3/p-3 Key: YONPGGFAJWQGJC-UHFFFAOYSA-K; InChI=1/3ClH.Ti/h3*1H;/q;;;+3/p-3 Key: YONPGGFAJWQGJC-DFZHHIFOAS
- SMILES: Cl[Ti](Cl)Cl

Properties
Chemical formula	TiCl_{3}
Molar mass	154.225 g/mol
Appearance	red-violet crystals hygroscopic
Density	2.64 g/cm^{3}
Melting point	440 °C (824 °F; 713 K) (decomposes)
Solubility in water	very soluble
Solubility	soluble in acetone, acetonitrile, certain amines; insoluble in ether and hydrocarbons
Magnetic susceptibility (χ)	+1110.0×10^{−6} cm^{3}/mol
Refractive index (n_{D})	1.4856

Hazards
- Occupational safety and health (OHS/OSH)
Main hazards	Corrosive
Safety data sheet (SDS)	External MSDS

Related compounds
Other anions	Titanium(III) fluoride Titanium(III) bromide Titanium(III) iodide
Other cations	Scandium(III) chloride Chromium(III) chloride Vanadium(III) chloride
Related compounds	Titanium(IV) chloride Titanium(II) chloride
- Except where otherwise noted, data are given for materials in their standard state (at 25 °C [77 °F], 100 kPa). verify (what is ?) Infobox references

Titanium(III) chloride is the inorganic compound with the formula TiCl_{3}. In its pure anhydrous form, it is a violet-colored solid. At least four distinct species have this formula; additionally hydrated derivatives are known. TiCl_{3} is one of the most common halides of titanium and is an important catalyst for the manufacture of polyolefins.

== Structure and bonding ==
In TiCl_{3}, each titanium atom has one d electron, rendering its derivatives paramagnetic, that is, the substance is attracted into a magnetic field. Solutions of titanium(III) chloride are violet, which arises from excitations of its d-electron. The colour is not

Four solid forms or polymorphs of TiCl_{3} are known. All feature titanium in an octahedral coordination sphere. These forms can be distinguished by crystallography as well as by their magnetic properties, which probes exchange interactions. β-TiCl_{3} crystallizes as brown needles. Its structure consists of chains of TiCl_{6} octahedra that share opposite faces such that the closest Ti–Ti contact is 2.91 Å. This short distance indicates strong metal–metal interactions (see figure in upper right). The three violet "layered" forms, named for their color and their tendency to flake, are called alpha (α), gamma (γ), and delta (δ). In α-TiCl_{3}, the chloride anions are hexagonal close-packed. In γ-TiCl_{3}, the chlorides anions are cubic close-packed. Finally, disorder in shift successions, causes an intermediate between alpha and gamma structures, called the δ form. The TiCl_{6} share edges in each form, with 3.60 Å being the shortest distance between the titanium cations. This large distance between titanium cations precludes direct metal-metal bonding. In contrast, the trihalides of the heavier metals hafnium and zirconium engage in metal-metal bonding. Direct Zr–Zr bonding is indicated in zirconium(III) chloride. The difference between the Zr(III) and Ti(III) materials is attributed in part to the relative radii of these metal centers.

Two hydrates of titanium(III) chloride are known, i.e. complexes containing aquo ligands. These include the pair of hydration isomers [Ti(H_{2}O)_{6}]Cl_{3} and [Ti(H_{2}O)_{4}Cl_{2}]Cl(H_{2}O)_{2}. The former is violet and the latter, with two molecules of water of crystallization, is green.

== Synthesis and reactivity ==
TiCl_{3} is produced usually by reduction of titanium(IV) chloride. Older reduction methods used hydrogen:

2 TiCl_{4} + H_{2} → 2 HCl + 2 TiCl_{3}

More modern techniques prefer aluminum; the product is sold as a mixture with aluminium trichloride, TiCl_{3}·AlCl_{3}.

TiCl_{3} can also be produced by the reaction of titanium metal and hot, concentrated hydrochloric acid; the reaction does not proceed at room temperature, as titanium is passivated against most mineral acids by a thin surface layer of titanium dioxide.

2 Ti + 6 HCl → 3 H_{2} + 2 TiCl_{3}

Treating TiCl_{3} with tetrahydrofuran (THF) gives the light-blue colored, meridional complex, TiCl_{3}(THF)_{3}:

TiCl_{3} + 3 C_{4}H_{8}O → TiCl_{3}(OC_{4}H_{8})_{3}

TiCl_{3}·AlCl_{3} gives the same product.

An analogous dark green complex arises from complexation with dimethylamine. In a reaction where all ligands are exchanged, TiCl_{3} is a precursor to the blue-colored complex Ti(acac)_{3}.

The more reduced titanium(II) chloride is prepared by the thermal disproportionation of TiCl_{3} at 500 °C. The reaction is driven by the loss of volatile TiCl_{4}:

2 TiCl_{3} → TiCl_{2} + TiCl_{4}

The trichloride is a Lewis acid, forming ternary hexahalide complexes with stoichiometry M_{3}TiCl_{6}. These have structures that depend on the cation (M^{+}) added. Caesium chloride treated with titanium(II) chloride and hexachlorobenzene produces crystalline CsTi_{2}Cl_{7}. In these structures Ti^{3+} exhibits octahedral coordination geometry.

== Applications ==
TiCl_{3} is the main Ziegler–Natta catalyst, responsible for most industrial production of polyethylene. The catalytic activities depend strongly on the polymorph of the TiCl_{3} (α vs. β vs. γ vs. δ) and the method of preparation.

=== Laboratory use ===
TiCl_{3} is also a specialized reagent in organic synthesis, useful for reductive coupling reactions, often in the presence of added reducing agents such as zinc. It reduces oximes to imines. Titanium trichloride can reduce nitrate to ammonium ion thereby allowing for the sequential analysis of nitrate and ammonia. Slow deterioration occurs in air-exposed titanium trichloride, often resulting in erratic results, such as in reductive coupling reactions.

== Safety ==
TiCl_{3} and most of its complexes are typically handled under air-free conditions to prevent reactions with oxygen and moisture. Samples of TiCl_{3} can be relatively air stable or pyrophoric.
