= Industrial processes =

Process of producing goods

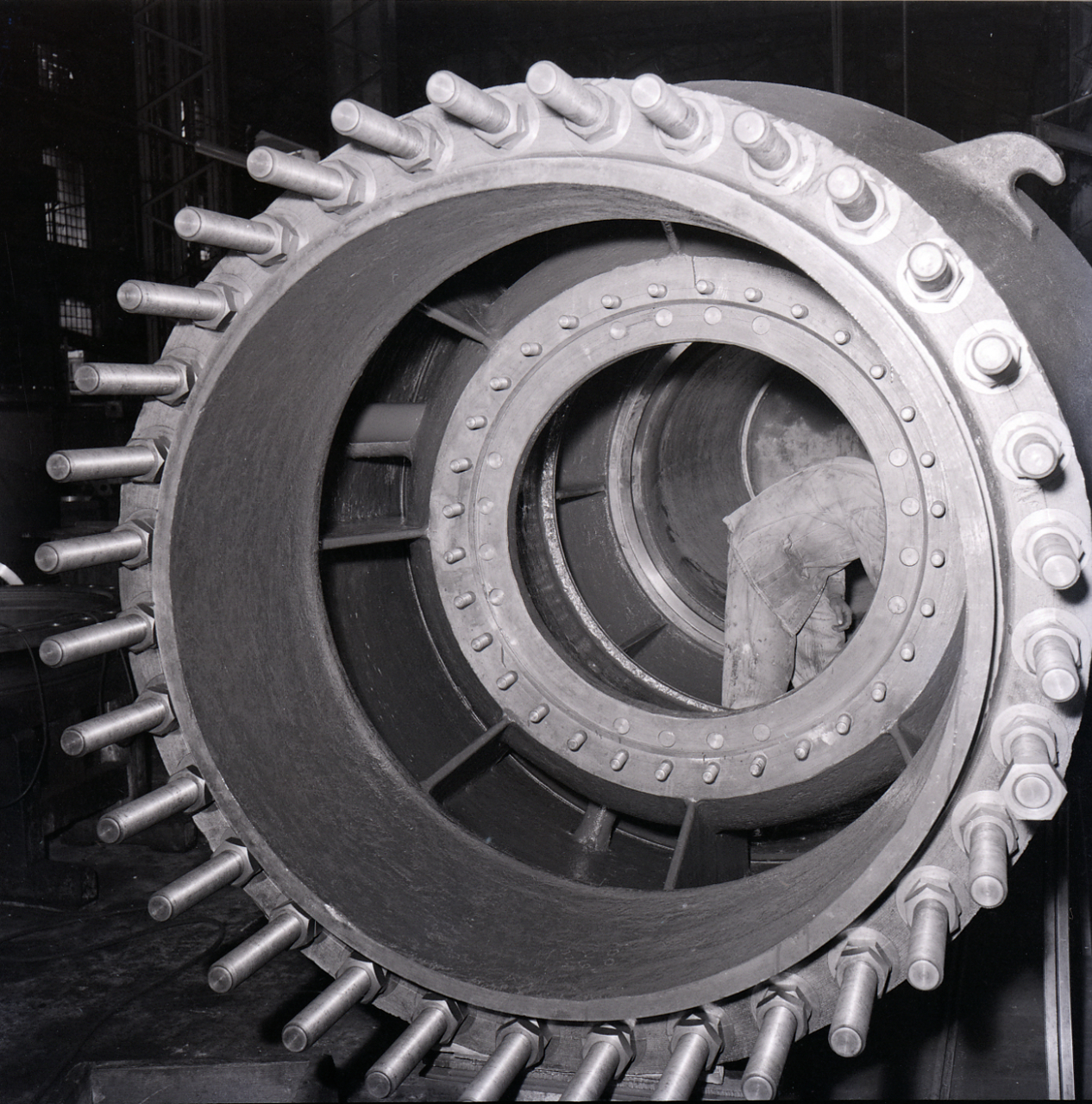
Steelworks of Italy in 1958

Industrial processes are procedures involving chemical, physical, electrical, or mechanical steps to aid in the manufacturing of an item or items, usually carried out on a very large scale. Industrial processes are the key components of heavy industry.

== Chemical processes by main basic material ==
Certain chemical process yield important basic materials for society, e.g., (cement, steel, aluminum, and fertilizer). However, these chemical reactions contribute to climate change by emitting carbon dioxide, a greenhouse gas, through chemical reactions, as well as through the combustion of fossil fuels to generate the high temperatures needed to reach the activation energies of the chemical reactions.

=== Cement (the paste within concrete) ===
- Calcination – Limestone, which is largely composed of fossilized calcium carbonate (CaCO_{3}), breaks down at high temperatures into useable calcium oxide (CaO) and carbon dioxide gas (CO_{2}), which gets released as a by-product. This chemical reaction, called calcination, figures most prominently in creating cement (the paste within concrete). The reaction is also important in providing calcium oxide to act as a chemical flux (removal of impurities) within a blast furnace.

CaCO_{3}(s) → CaO(s) + CO_{2}(g)

=== Steel ===
- Smelting – Inside a blast furnace, carbon monoxide (CO) is released by combusting coke (a high-carbon derivative of coal) and removes the undesired oxygen (O) within ores. CO_{2} is released as a by-product, carrying away the oxygen and leaving behind the desired pure metal. Most prominently, iron smelting is how steel (largely iron with small amounts of carbon) is created from mined iron ore and coal.

Fe_{2}O_{3}(s) + 3 CO(g) → 2 Fe(s) + 3 CO_{2}(g)

=== Aluminium ===
- Hall–Héroult process – Aluminium oxide (Al_{2}O_{3}) is smelted with coke (C) in a high-temperature electrolysis reaction, yielding the desired pure aluminium (Al) and a mixture of CO and CO_{2}.

Al_{2}O_{3}(s) + 3 C(s) → 2 Al(s) + 3 CO(g)
2 Al_{2}O_{3}(s) + 3 C(s) → 4 Al(s) + 3 CO_{2}(g)

=== Fertilizer ===
- Haber process – Atmospheric nitrogen (N_{2}) is separated, yielding ammonia (NH_{3}), which is used to make all synthetic fertilizer. The Haber process uses a fossil carbon source, generally natural gas, to provide the CO for the water–gas shift reaction, yielding hydrogen (H_{2}) and releasing CO_{2}. The H_{2} is used to break the strong triple bond in N_{2}, yielding industrial ammonia.

CH_{4}(g) + H_{2}O(g) → CO(g) + 3 H_{2}(g)
CO(g) + H_{2}O(g) → H_{2}(g) + CO_{2}(g)
N_{2}(g) + 3 H_{2}(g) → 2 NH_{3}(g)

=== Other chemical processes ===
- Disinfection – chemical treatment to kill bacteria and viruses
- Pyroprocessing – using heat to chemically combine materials, such as in cement

== Electrolysis ==
The availability of electricity and its effect on materials gave rise to several processes for plating or separating metals.

- Electrolytic process – any process using electrolysis
- Electrophoretic deposition – electrolytic deposition of colloidal particles in a liquid medium
- Electropolishing – the reverse of electroplating
- Electrotyping – using electroplating to produce printing plates
- Gilding, electroplating, anodizing, electrowinning – depositing a material on an electrode
- Isoelectric focusing a.k.a. electrofocusing – similar to electroplating, but separating molecules
- Metallizing, plating, spin coating – the generic terms for giving non-metals a metallic coating

== Cutting ==
- Electrical discharge machining (EDM)
- Laser cutting
- Machining – the mechanical cutting and shaping of metal which involves the loss of the material
- Oxy-fuel welding and cutting
- Plasma cutting
- Sawing
- Shearing
- Water-jet cutting – cutting materials using a very high-pressure jet of water

== Metalworking ==
- Case-hardening, differential hardening, shot peening – creating a wear-resistant surface
- Casting – shaping of a liquid material by pouring it into moulds and letting it solidify
- Die cutting – A "forme" or "die" is pressed onto a flat material in order to cut, score, punch and otherwise shape the material
- Electric arc furnace — very-high-temperature processing
- Forging – the shaping of metal by use of heat and hammer
- Hydroforming – a tube of metal is expanded into a mould under pressure
- Precipitation hardening – heat treatment used to strengthen malleable materials
- Progressive stamping – the production of components from a strip or roll
- Sandblasting – cleaning of a surface using sand or other particles
- Smelting and direct reduction – extracting metals from ores
- Soldering, brazing, welding – a process for joining metals
- Stamping
- Steelmaking – turning "pig iron" from smelting into steel
- Tumble polishing – for polishing
- Work hardening – adding strength to metals, alloys, etc.

=== Iron and steel ===
- Basic oxygen steelmaking
- Bessemer process
- Blast furnace – produced cast iron
- Catalan forge, open hearth furnace, bloomery – produced wrought iron
- Cementation process
- Crucible steel
- Direct reduction – produced direct reduced iron
- Smelting – the process of using furnaces to produce steel, copper, etc.

== Molding ==
The physical shaping of materials by forming their liquid form using a mould

- Blow molding as in plastic containers or in the glass container industry – making hollow objects by blowing them into a mould
- Casting, sand casting – the shaping of molten metal or plastics using a mould
- Compression molding
- Sintering, powder metallurgy – the making of objects from metal or ceramic powder

== Separation ==
Many materials exist in an impure form. Purification or separation provides a usable product.

- Comminution – reduces the size of physical particles (it exists between crushing and grinding)
- Frasch process – for extracting molten sulfur from the ground
- Froth flotation, flotation process – separating minerals through flotation
- Liquid–liquid extraction – dissolving one substance in another

== Distillation ==
Distillation is the purification of volatile substances by evaporation and condensation

- Batch distillation
- Continuous distillation
- Fractional distillation, steam distillation, vacuum distillation
- Fractionating column
- Spinning cone

== Additive manufacturing ==
In additive manufacturing, material is progressively added to the piece until the desired shape and size are obtained.

- Fused deposition modeling (FDM)
- Photolithography
- Selective laser sintering (SLS)
- Stereolithography (SLA)

== Petroleum and organic compounds ==
The nature of an organic molecule means it can be transformed at the molecular level to create a range of products.

- Alkylation – refining of crude oil
- Burton process – cracking of hydrocarbons
- Cracking (chemistry) – the generic term for breaking up the larger molecules
- Cumene process – making phenol and acetone from benzene
- Friedel–Crafts reaction, Kolbe–Schmitt reaction
- Olefin metathesis, thermal depolymerization
- Oxo process – produces aldehydes from alkenes
- Polymerization
- Raschig hydroxylamine process – produces hydroxylamine, a precursor of nylon
- Transesterification – organic chemicals

== Organized by product ==
- Aluminium – ( Hall-Héroult process, Deville process, Bayer process, Wöhler process)
- Ammonia, used in fertilizer – (Haber process)
- Bromine – (Dow process)
- Chlorine, used in chemicals – (chloralkali process, Weldon process, Hooker process)
- Fat – (rendering)
- Fertilizer – (nitrophosphate process)
- Glass – (Pilkington process)
- Gold – (bacterial oxidation, Parkes process)
- Graphite – (Acheson process)
- Heavy water, used to refine radioactive products – (Girdler sulfide process)
- Hydrogen – (water–gas shift reaction, steam reforming)
- Lead (and bismuth) – (Betts electrolytic process, Betterton-Kroll process)
- Nickel – (Mond process)
- Nitric acid – (Ostwald process)
- Paper – (pulping, Kraft process, Fourdrinier machine)
- Rubber – (vulcanization)
- Salt – (Alberger process, Grainer evaporation process)
- Semiconductor crystals – (Bridgman–Stockbarger method, Czochralski method)
- Silver – (Patio process, Parkes process)
- Silicon carbide – (Acheson process, Lely process)
- Sodium carbonate, used for soap – (Leblanc process, Solvay process, Leblanc-Deacon process)
- Sulfuric acid – (lead chamber process, contact process)
- Titanium – (Hunter process, Kroll process)
- Zirconium – (Hunter process, Kroll process, van Arkel–de Boer process)

A list by process:

- Alberger process, Grainer evaporation process – produces salt from brine
- Bacterial oxidation – used to produce gold
- Bayer process – the extraction of aluminium from ore
- Chloralkali process, Weldon process – for producing chlorine and sodium hydroxide
- Dow process – produces bromine from brine
- Formox process – oxidation of methanol to produce formaldehyde
- Girdler sulfide process – for making heavy water
- Hunter process, Kroll process – produces titanium and zirconium
- Industrial rendering – the separation of fat from bone and protein
- Lead chamber process, contact process – production of sulfuric acid
- Mond process – nickel
- Nitrophosphate process – a number of similar process for producing fertilizer
- Ostwald process – produces nitric acid
- Packaging
- Pidgeon process – produces magnesium, reducing the oxide using silicon
- Steam reforming, water gas shift reaction – produce hydrogen and carbon monoxide from methane or hydrogen and carbon dioxide from water and carbon monoxide
- Vacuum metalising – a finishing process
- Van Arkel–de Boer process – for producing titanium, zirconium, hafnium, vanadium, thorium, or protactinium

== See also ==
- Chemical engineering
- Industrial Extraction
- Mass production
- Multilevel Flow Modeling
- Process (engineering)
