= John Inglis =

John Inglis may refer to:

== Sportspeople ==
- John Inglis (footballer, born 1857) (1857–1942), Scottish footballer who played as a goalkeeper
- John Inglis (footballer, born 1859) (1859–?), Scottish footballer who played as a forward
- John Inglis (footballer, born 1966), Scottish footballer who played as a defender
- John Inglis (American football) (1887–1918), American college football coach
- John Inglis (cricketer) (born 1979), English cricketer for Yorkshire
- John Frederic Inglis (1853–1923), Kent county cricketer, also played football for Wanderers and Scotland

== Other ==
- John Inglis, Lord Glencorse (1810–1891), Scottish former politician and judge
- Sir John Inglis, 2nd Baronet (1683–1771), Postmaster General for Scotland
- John Inglis (bishop) (1777–1850), Church of England bishop
- John Inglis (missionary) (1808–1891), Scottish missionary to the New Hebrides
- John Inglis (shipbuilder) (1842–1919), Scottish engineer and shipbuilder at A. & J. Inglis
- John Inglis (trade unionist) (died 1912), Scottish trade union leader
- John G. Inglis (1899–1990), Canadian electrical engineer and transit manager
- John Eardley Inglis (1814–1862), Scottish soldier
- John K. Inglis (?–2011), British biologist and writer
- John C. Inglis (born 1954), former Deputy Director of the National Security Agency
- John Gilchrist Inglis (1906–1972), British Royal Navy officer
- John Inglis (moderator) (1762–1834), Scottish minister of the Church of Scotland
- John Alexander Inglis (1873–1941), Scottish landowner, advocate and historian
- John Inglis (civil servant) (1820–1854), East India Company civil servant
- John Inglis and Company, Canadian firm, formerly a weapons manufacturer, then a domestic appliance manufacturer
- John Inglis (Royal Navy officer) (1743–1807), Scottish Royal Navy officer
- John Bellingham Inglis (1790–1870), English bibliophile
- John Inglis (American politician), member of the Pennsylvania House of Representatives
