= Rensselaer Society of Engineers =

Fraternity at Rensselaer Polytechnic Institute

Coordinates: 42°43′47″N 73°40′32″W

- RSE
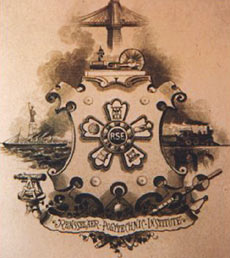
- Founded: 1866; 159 years ago Rensselaer Polytechnic Institute
- Type: Social
- Affiliation: Independent
- Status: Active
- Scope: Local
- Motto: "In time, through friendship, science and knowledge will rule the world"
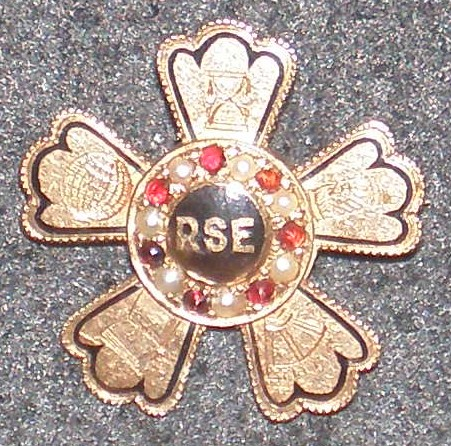
- Member badge
- Colors: Black and Orange
- Publication: The oveRSEer
- Chapters: 1
- Former Name: Pi Eta Scientific Society
- Headquarters: 1501 Sage Avenue; Troy, New York 12180; United States
- Website: RSE Alumni website

The Rensselaer Society of Engineers (RSE) is a social fraternity founded in 1866 at Rensselaer Polytechnic Institute in Troy, NY. Originally named The Pi Eta Scientific Society, the organization was incorporated in 1873 in the state of New York. Arriving on campus at about the same time as some of the first fraternities, it has remained one of the oldest "local" organizations in the U.S. RSE is the only independent fraternity at Rensselaer. They have chosen to remain independent to maintain the freedom to set their own policies and make their own managerial decisions. Contrary to what their name may imply, members major not only in engineering, but also in such disciplines as science, management, architecture, and the arts. Society members are active in not only campus and local activities, but are also in many national organizations.

== History ==
The Rensselaer Society of Engineers was founded as the Pantotherian Society or The Pi Eta Scientific Society in 1866. The society was subsequently incorporated under the laws of the state of New York in 1873. Under society's constitution, candidates for membership were nominated by members of the society. After one's proposal for membership there was a minimum of a one-week waiting period during which their candidacy was considered. After the prescribed waiting period their membership was decided by a vote of a society. Initially, any potential member receiving a black ball during the vote was declined membership, the constitution was later amended to permit two black balls before a member was declined. Upon initiation new members were expected to pay a $3 initiation fee. In addition to students being eligible for membership in Pi Eta, honorary membership was also extended to any graduate or officer of Rensselaer or any person who had distinguished themselves in their scientific endeavors. Membership could also be revoked by a two thirds majority vote of the membership. At its first officer election held on May 24, 1867 the following officers were elected:

- President: Pompeyo Sariol of Puerto Principe, Cuba
- Recording Secretary: Albert H. Millet of Paris, France
- Corresponding Secretary: Palmer H. Baerman of Troy, New York
- Treasurer: Max L. Goldstein of New York City

In 1867 the society created a library to collect scientific and engineering publications in addition to original works by members. Today the library continues to be housed in the society's clubhouse. A model of diversity, the society counted among its members students from across the United States and Central and South America. By 1880 Pi Eta's membership included two Japanese students and one of five Chinese students enrolled at Rensselaer.

In 1883, the Pi Eta scientific society became the Rensselaer Society Of Engineers. The reason for this was to distinguish themselves from the other fraternities in the region as well as to show their close ties with Rensselaer Polytechnic Institute. Prior to occupying its current location the Rensselaer Society of Engineers have met in several locations in the city of Troy. Prior to the present headquarters location, a house on Burdett Avenue in Troy was used for approximately four-years between 1920 and 1924. The previous locations were used mainly for meeting and study purposes.

In chronological order, these locations were:

- Prior to April 1868: Rented rooms belonging to a Dr. Watkins
- April 1868 – 1870: Unknown Location
- After 1870: Hannibal Green Building, Broadway, Troy NY
- Before 1881: 4th Street, Troy, NY
- 1881 - 1908: 219 River Street, Troy, NY
- 1908 - 1920: 257 Broadway, Troy, NY (second floor above a bank - three rented rooms)
- 1920 - 1924: Burdett Ave., Troy, NY
- 1924 through Present: 1501 Sage Ave, Troy, NY

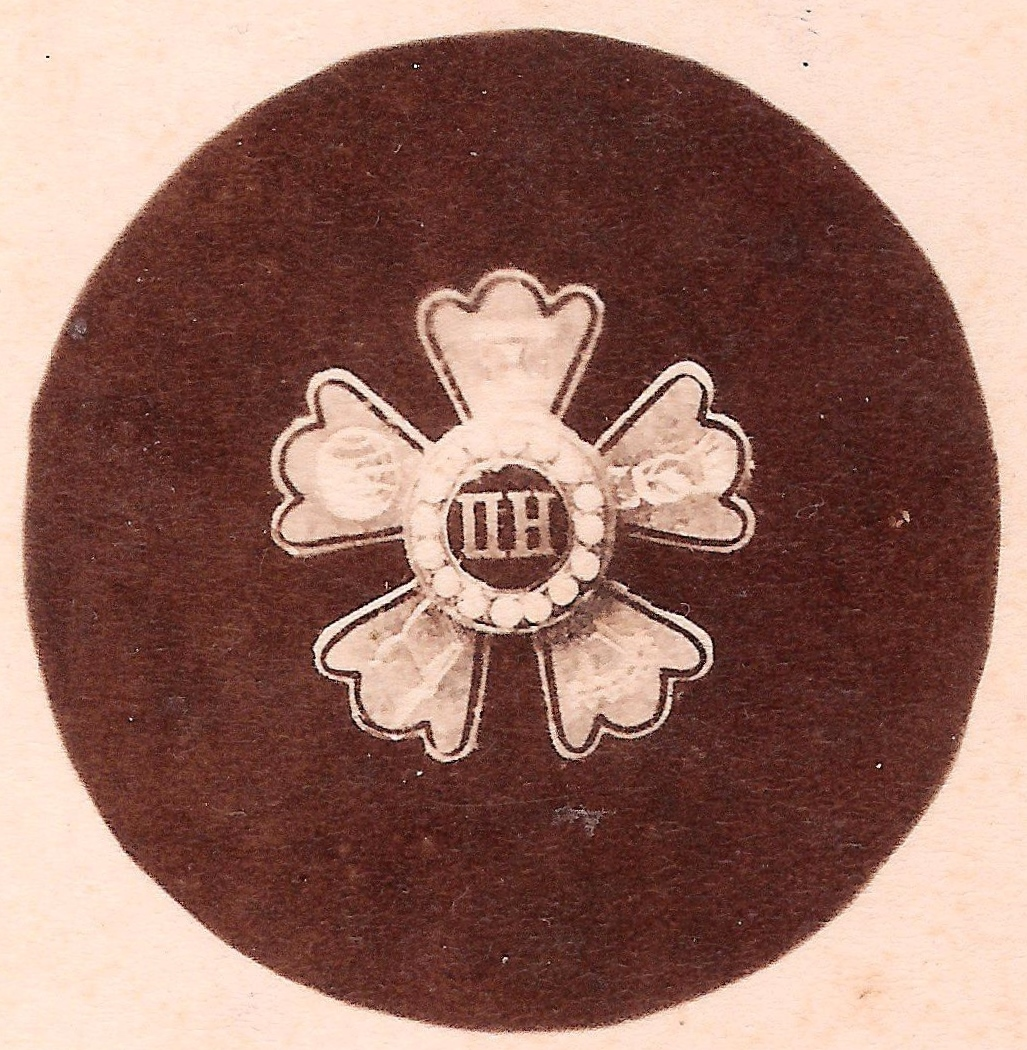
Early Pi Eta membership pin issued prior to 1883

== Symbols ==
The colors of RSE are black and orange. Its motto is "In time, through friendship, science and knowledge will rule the world". Its publication is The oveRSEer.

== The Clubhouse ==
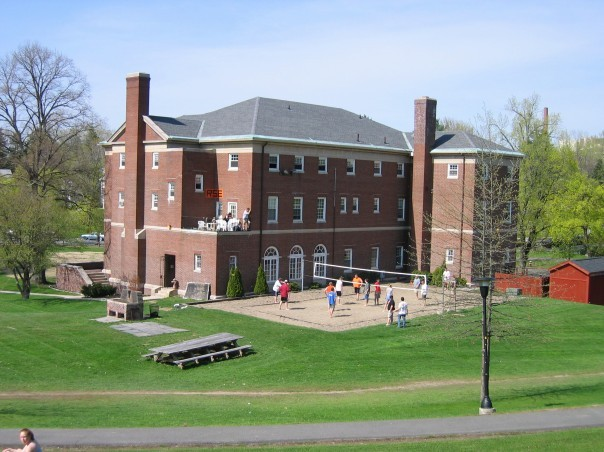
Clubhouse from the south

The idea of constructing a clubhouse, potentially with dormitory style living quarters was first formally discussed at the society's 1909 annual meeting. At that meeting, it was decided to wait until such a time that the institute's students began relocating from downtown Troy to the main campus which is situated on a hill above the city. Over the ensuing years student living preferences changed as predicted and the institute dormitories and educational buildings on the hill grew. At the 1912 annual meeting a house committee was charged with evaluating the feasibility of building a clubhouse and ultimately determining its location. The committee eventually decided on six key points:

- That a location as near the campus as possible would be desirable.
- Since there were no buildings on the hill in which rooms similar to those occupied by the society could be obtained, that it would be necessary to erect a new house suitable for the society's purpose.
- That to make this house strictly a clubhouse would be adding expense to the society without increasing its income; and therefore, to increase the income of the society sufficiently to meet the cost and maintenance of a home, it would be necessary to provide a dormitory in the house.
- That while sufficient accommodations might be provided in the house for a commissary, the maintenance of an eating club was not within the province of the society, and must be carried on by the members independently.
- That with sufficient dormitory space for twenty to twenty-five students, a house would be entirely practical financially, provided the active members of the society could raise more than enough money to purchase a building lot.
- That while it may not be advisable to proceed with the building at the present time, it would be advisable to purchase the lot immediately—any delay might make it difficult to obtain a suitable location in the vicinity of campus.

With these ideas in mind, in 1912 the house committee obtained purchase options on two lots owned by a development company called Troy Parkway Villa Site. The first lot could be purchased for $3,500 while the second was $2,500. The two lots were located on People's Avenue, one block away from the main campus. With the purchase options in hand the building committee solicited donations to commence the project with the hope that a decision could be made by the 1913 annual meeting. The solicitations included a conceptual floor plan for each of the clubhouse's three proposed floors. At the meeting the total amount of funds pledged toward the construction effort amounted to $430. Fund raising strategies were discussed and implemented however despite these efforts the project would languish for another two years.

On May 12, 1915 it was finally announced that, for $3,750, the Rensselaer Society of Engineers had purchased a one-acre lot in the Troy Parkway Villa Site from the firm of Gilbert Geer, Jr. & Co. Following the purchase, the society's building fund was left with $14,900. The lot was situated on the corner of Sage Avenue and Griswold Road, closer to campus and the new quadrangle dormitories than the People's Avenue lots first considered in 1912. The society intended to erect a clubhouse on the property in the near future. This was at a time when all the fraternities on campus had begun planning to move into houses constructed close to the rapidly growing institute. The initial design plans called for a structure "strictly fireproof and modern in every particular" that was expected to cost around $50,000, the equivalent of $1.17 million today. At the time it was hoped that construction would begin as early as the summer of 1915. The reality of the fundraising challenge soon became evident and the effort took longer than expected. It is estimated that there were approximately 350 living alumni in 1915. The average contribution needed to achieve the committee's $50,000 goal was approximately $43, which if adjusted for inflation would be nearly $990 today. For comparison, the annual median household income in 1915 was $687, or $16,000 when adjusted for inflation.

As the dream of constructing a purpose built clubhouse for the society was hampered by funding challenges, the population of RSE students on campus continued to grow. In 1920 the society purchased a house on Burdett Avenue adjacent to Samaritan Hospital to house some of its members. While the Burdett Avenue house did not fully satisfy the needs of the society, it did make RSE one of the first four fraternities on campus to own their own house. The fund raising effort to build a house on the vacant property on the corner of Sage and Griswold continued with both the graduate and undergraduate members pressing alumni for both donations and previously unpaid activity fees. The society even offered to repay loans from alumni from the proceeds of the sale of the Burdett Avenue house once the new clubhouse was completed. Ultimately a donation from Pittsburgh industrialist and philanthropist John M. Lockhart of $100,000 proved to be sufficient to begin construction in 1923 with famed architect Bertram Grosvenor Goodhue chosen to be architect for the house while the Ernest F. Carlson Company of Springfield Massachusetts was selected as the contractor.

As construction progressed it became evident that additional funds would be necessary. To support the completion of the clubhouse, Lockhart made a subsequent $100,000 donation. After being completed the house was formally dedicated on June 12, 1924, with alumni coming back to Troy in force for the occasion. The formal completion of the house occurred on September 13, 1924 and a formal gala was held the following October. Attending the celebration was Lockhart who had the honor of being the first to sign the Clubhouse's new guest book followed by the members of the building committee who had worked for nearly a decade to make the clubhouse a reality.

There are multiple specialized rooms in the clubhouse. There is an archive room, billiards room, and a library. Originally, members lived in a dormitory located on the third floor of the clubhouse. The remaining levels of the house were full of study rooms, a lecture hall, a room for the chef, and an infirmary. Since then multiple rooms have been built on the second and third floors to house the members that decide to live in the clubhouse.

Over the years the mechanical and electrical systems of the house have been gradually modernized. In 2000 the clubhouse roof was replaced for only the second time since its construction. Beginning in the Fall of 2009, renovations were done to the living room with $100,000 spent to fix plaster damaged by water leaks. The windows and doors were also replaced to enhance house security and allow for usage as the old ones were sealed shut. The purpose of the living room is not only for house functions, but is used to host guest speakers throughout the year. The living room is also the venue for the annual Holiday Banquet. Renovations to the clubhouse continued in 2013 as significant restoration work was performed on the building's exterior masonry features. The house's front brick patio was restored and its underlying steel reinforced concrete structure was repaired for the first time since its construction. Additional extensive repairs were conducted to replace damaged and cracked limestone trim stones.

== Activities ==
The historic house is an iconic image in the Rensselaer landscape. For this reason, RSE is host to a variety of functions, both fraternal and academic. Nearly every year since the construction of the clubhouse RSE has also hosted a Holiday Banquet. The banquet has been a long-standing tradition of the society, in which each member invites one or two of their professors to attend. Invitations are also sent out to the RPI Board of Trustees and the current President of the Institute as well. Each year a speaker is asked to present on a topic of their choice.

In the month of October, RPI hosts an annual Alumni Weekend for all past graduates of the university to come back for a reunion. RSE takes this opportunity to host a reunion of their own. This year (2016), RSE will host its sesquicentennial (150th) anniversary of its founding in 1866. RSE also hosts an Annual Alumni Greek Chowderfest

== Philanthropy ==
The Rensselaer Society of Engineers donates many hours and dollars each year to both local and national charitable organizations. Through Children International, RSE has supported children in Colombia as they struggle to grow up in poverty. RSE also hosts an annual breakfast to raise money for The Children's Miracle Network. This popular event involves the cooking of hundreds of breakfast sandwiches which are sold to students and delivered to various campus faculty and offices. Since the 1960s RSE has also proudly hosted an annual holiday party for local children through the Troy Boys and Girls Club and other organizations.

=== Scholarships ===
The Rensselaer Society of Engineers offers a number of scholarships annually to its members.

- The RSE-Rensselaer Academic Scholarship is awarded to a sophomore and is applied by Rensselaer to tuition for both the junior and senior years. It is based on excellence in the classroom.
- The RSE-Rensselaer Brotherhood Scholarship is awarded to a junior who has shown exceptional community, school, and fraternity spirit and involvement while maintaining strong academic success. It is applied by Rensselaer to tuition for senior year.
- The Becker Scholarship, in memory of Frank W. Becker '83, is awarded to a sophomore who has shown exceptional dedication to RSE brotherhood. It is applied by the RSE Foundation to room and board for the junior year.
- The Rudy Bergfield Scholarship was started by a substantial donation for Rudy Bergfield '49. This scholarship is for a member who is involved with athletics, is in good academic standing, who shows dedication to the RSE brotherhood. Rudy Bergfield was the captain of the men's lacrosse team during his years at Rensselaer.

== Notable members ==
Following is a list of notable members of RSE.

- Robert Rufus Bridgers (1879), railroad engineer and Confederate States of America politician
- Leffert L. Buck (1868), civil engineer responsible for the Verrugas Viaduct, the steel suspension bridge over the Niagara Gorge, and the Williamsburg Bridge
- William Hubert Burr (1872), engineer involved with the Catskill Aqueduct and Isthmian Canal Commission
- Sanford Lockwood Cluett (Honorary), businessman and inventor
- Sandford Fleming (honorary), railway engineer and inventor of worldwide standard time
- William O. Hotchkiss (Honorary), tenth president of Rensselaer Polytechnic Institute
- Matthew A. Hunter (1908, Honorary), metallurgist and inventor of the Hunter process for producing titanium metal
- John Inglis, football and baseball player
- William Metcalf (1858), steel manufacturer & early honorary member
- Henry G. Morse (1871), founder of The New York Ship Building Corporation
- L. Scott Rice (1980), director of the Air National Guard
- Palmer Ricketts (1875, Honorary), 11th president of Rensselaer
- Harry H. Rousseau (1891), civil engineer, Rear Admiral in the US Navy, and member of Isthmian Canal Commission
- Henry Rowland (1870), physicist, known for diffraction grating
- John F. Schenck (1961), physician and co-inventor of the first clinically viable high-field MRI scanner at General Electric
- John Alexander Low Waddell (1875), civil engineer and prolific bridge designer
- Don Carlos Young (1879), son of Brigham Young and architect for The Church of Jesus Christ of Latter-day Saints
