= Lars Fredrik Nilson =

Swedish chemist (1840 – 1899)

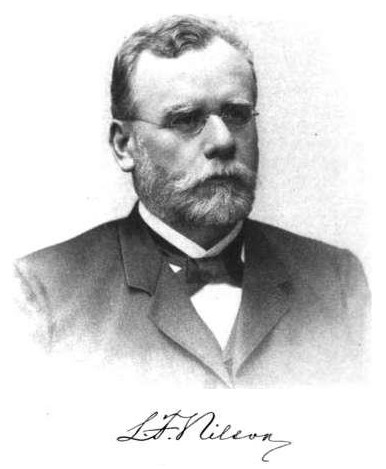
- Lars Fredrik Nilson
- Born: 27 May 1840; Skönberga, Östergötland, Sweden
- Died: 14 May 1899 (aged 58); Stockholm, Sweden
- Education: Uppsala University
- Known for: Discovery of scandium, agricultural chemistry
- Children: Gunnar Nilson
- Scientific career
- Workplaces: Royal Swedish Academy of Agriculture and Forestry
- Doctoral advisor: Lars Fredrik Svanberg

Lars Fredrik Nilson (27 May 1840 – 14 May 1899) was a Swedish chemist, professor at Uppsala University, and later Director of the Agricultural Chemical Experiment Station at the Royal Swedish Academy of Agriculture and Forestry in Stockholm.

He discovered the element scandium in 1879, by separating out scandium(III) oxide, also known as scandia. In addition to his work concerning the analytic chemistry of elements and rare earths, he made substantial contributions to Swedish agriculture, including methods of fertilization and the introduction of sugar beets as a crop.

== Education ==
Nilson was born in Skönberga parish in Östergötland, Sweden. Later his family relocated to the island of Gotland, where his father, Nikolaus, owned the farm Rosendal in Follingbo. During later life, Lars Fredrik Nilson retained a small holding on Gotland, which he visited yearly.

After graduating from Wisby high school on Gotland, Lars Fredrik Nilson enrolled at Uppsala University in 1859. There he studied the natural sciences including zoology and biology. His work in mineralogy was noted by the chemistry professor at Uppsala, Lars Fredrik Svanberg, a former student of Jöns Jakob Berzelius.

To obtain a Doctorate of Philosophy in Sweden, the candidate was expected to pass a series of examinations in all areas of study, including languages, history, and philosophy as well as their main area of study, within a fixed period of time. In 1865, just before Nilson could complete his final examination, his father became severely ill. Nilson returned home to Gotland, where he assumed management of the farm, working in the fields as needed. When his father recovered some months later, the harvest and autumn planting had been completed successfully, and Nilson had installed the first engine threshing machine to be used in Gotland. Nilson's own health had greatly benefited from his work on the farm: the young man who had arrived home in poor health had become much stronger. He was able to return to Uppsala and pass the next season's examinations, becoming a doctor of chemistry in 1866.

== Career ==
In 1866, Nilson became an associate professor of chemistry at Uppsala, with the responsibilities of chief assistant and demonstrator of chemistry for Svanberg's laboratory. He was a calm and patient teacher, relying more on demonstrations than on lectures. He insisted that after the work of the day was completed, it was to be left behind, and not discussed during leisure. His earliest papers mainly concerned sulfides, arsenical sulfosalt minerals, and selenous acid, extending the work of Berzelius.

=== Elements ===
In 1874 Nilson became professor of general and agricultural chemistry at Uppsala. From then on he could devote more time to research. He began working on rare earths such as euxenite and gadolinite, using methods of successive fractionation introduced by Nils Johan Berlin. One of his goals was to better understand the relationship of the newly discovered elements to the proposed periodic system.

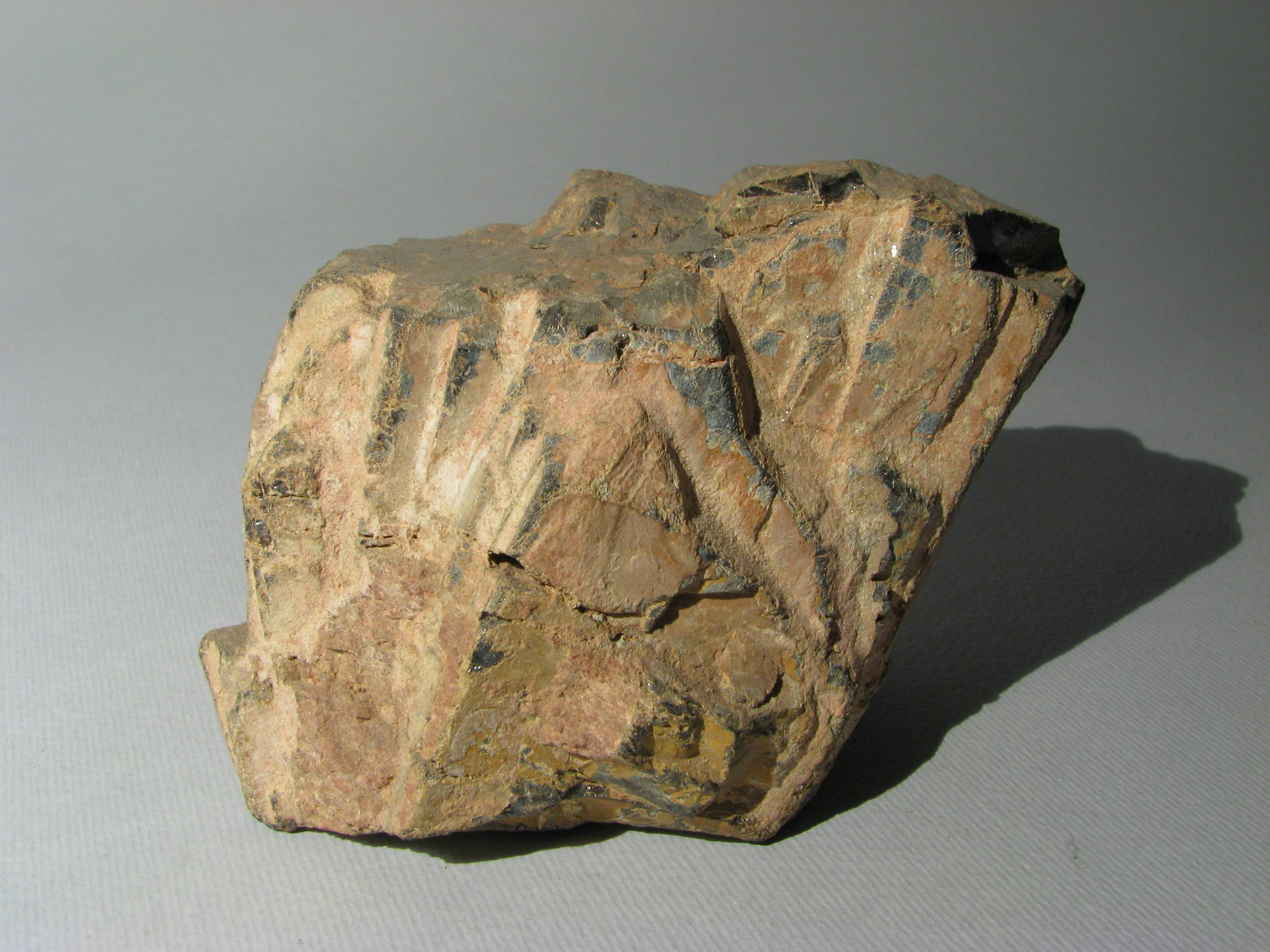
The mineral euxenite.

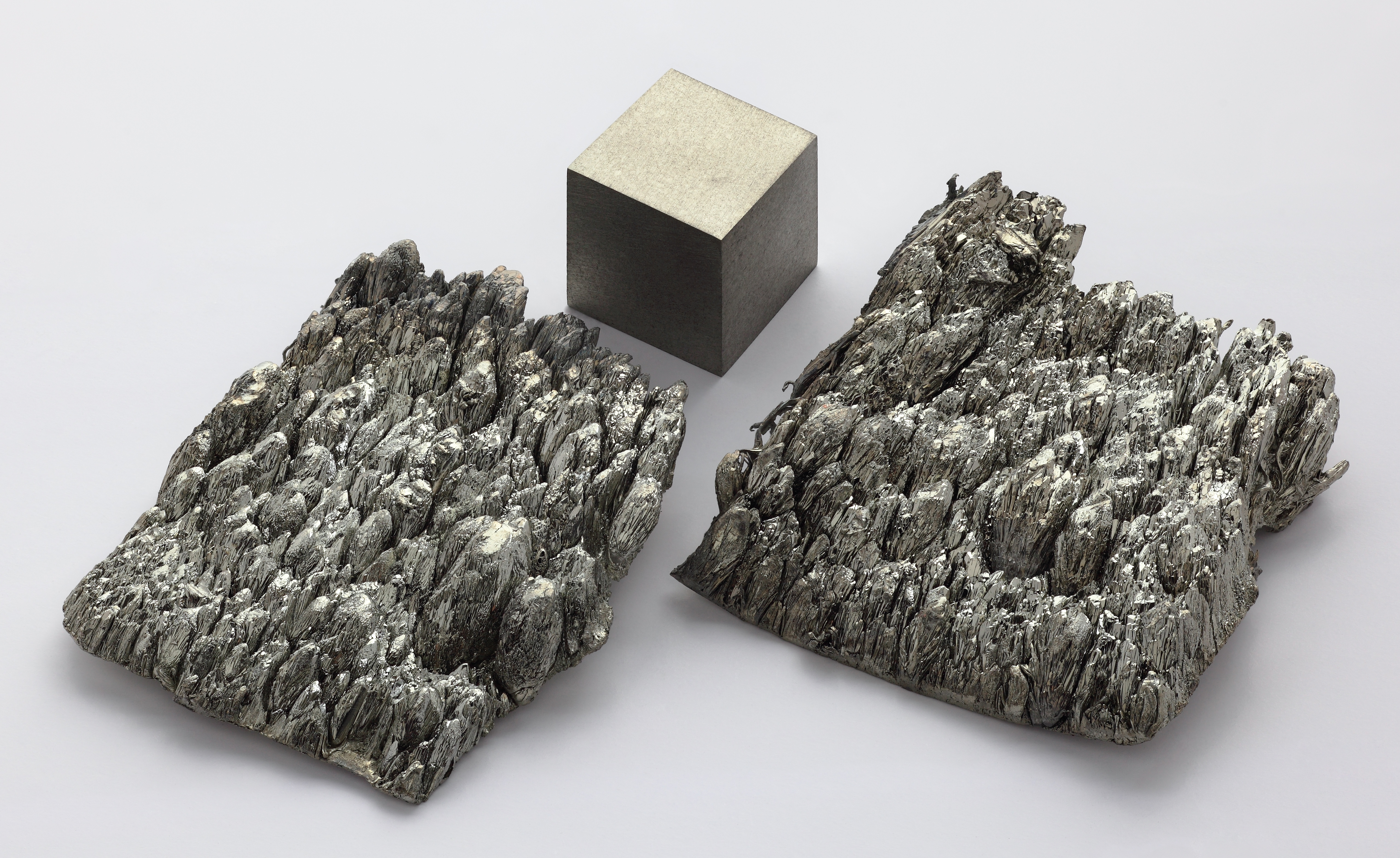
The element scandium.

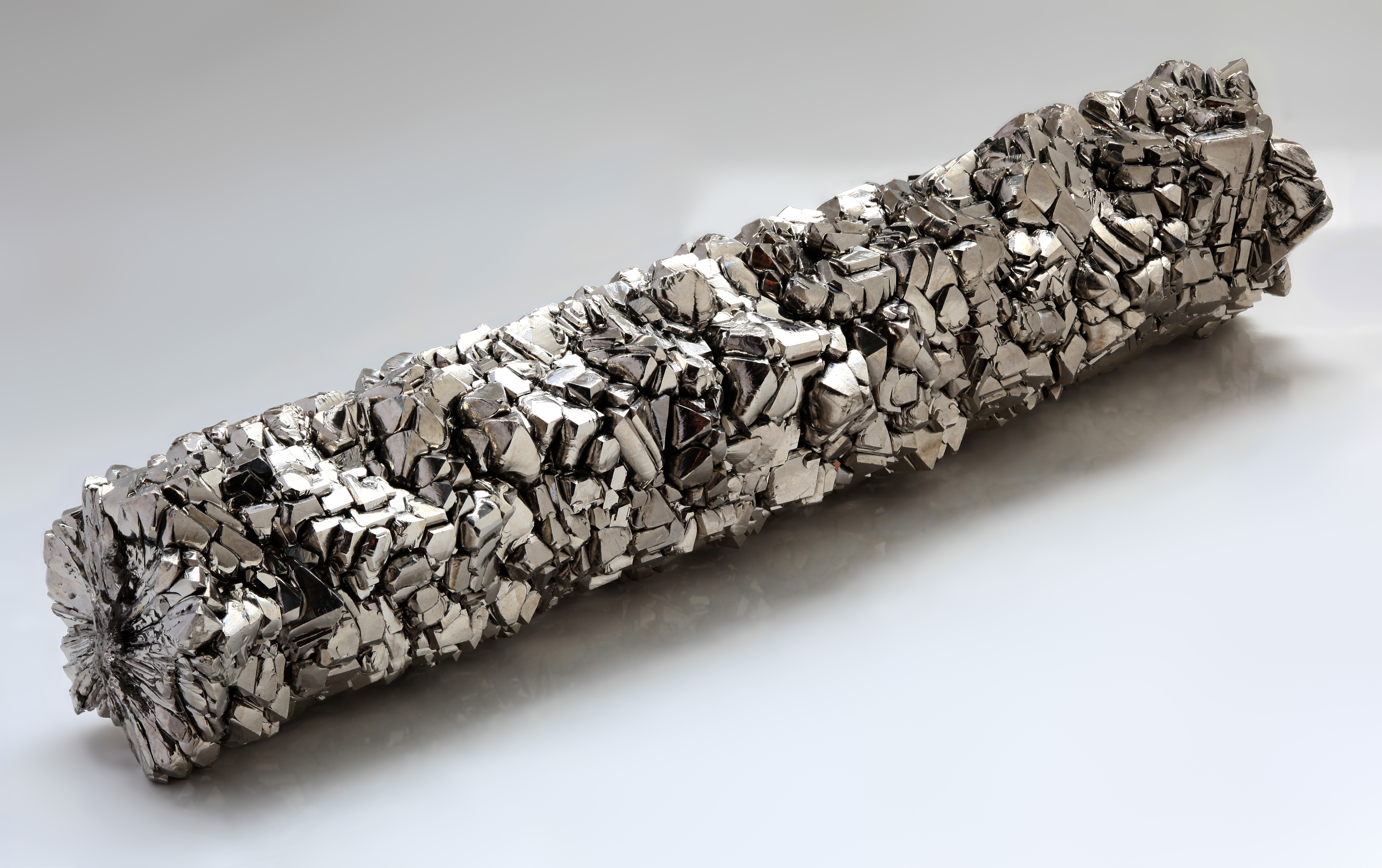
The element titanium.

In 1879 Nilson separated out the oxide scandia. By doing so he discovered a new element, scandium, which he named for Scandinavia. The discovery was of particular importance because the existence of an element with such properties, "ekaboron", had been predicted by Mendeleev, based on his organization of the periodic system. Nilson's spectral analysis indicated a previously unreported pattern of lines. Per Theodor Cleve demonstrated the equivalence of Nilson's scandium and Mendeleev's hypothetical ekaboron.

Nilson and Sven Otto Pettersson were the first to isolate titanium metal in a relatively pure form, extracting a 95% pure sample in 1887. Jöns Jacob Berzelius had extracted titanium metal in 1825, but only in a very impure form. In 1910 Matthew Hunter was finally able to produce 99.9% pure titanium metal, through his new Hunter process.

Nilson also studied the gas density of metals which made it possible to determine the valence of various metals.

=== Agriculture ===
Nilson was professor of analytical chemistry at Uppsala from 1878 until 1883, when he became professor of chemistry of the Royal Swedish Academy of Agriculture and Forestry in Stockholm. As an agricultural chemist and Director of the Agricultural Chemical Experiment Station, he published nearly sixty papers concerning topics such as soils and manures. As a result of his inquiries many of the swamps of Gotland were drained and cultivated. The sugar beet was introduced and became a major crop, as chalky moors were treated with potash fertilizers. He also conducted studies of cow's milk and various plants for cattle fodder.

Nilson was elected a foreign member of the Chemical Society of Great Britain on February 2, 1888. Nilson was a member of several other academies as well. He received several awards, including the Order of the Polar Star.
