= Hydrogen assisted magnesiothermic reduction =

The hydrogen assisted magnesiothermic reduction ("HAMR") process is a thermochemical process to obtain titanium metal from titanium oxides.

A technical challenge in the production of titanium metal is the formation of oxide impurities. The Kroll process, which is widely used commercially, addresses this challenge by converting titanium ore (an oxide) into titanium tetrachloride (TiCl_{4}). This intermediate is readily purified. It is reduced to titanium metal with magnesium. This technology is both capital, energy, and carbon-intensive. One advantage of the Kroll process, and several like it, is that it starts with titanium ores (e.g., illmenite), not a purified dioxide.

The HAMR technology also entails a two step process, starting with TiO_{2} under an atmosphere of hydrogen gas. The product TiH_{2} can be further processed to titanium metal through standard methods. The reduction of titanium oxides to titanium metal using magnesium does not occur. The novelty of the HAMR process is the inclusion of hydrogen.
