= Duplex strainers =

Duplex strainer or twin basket strainer is a type of filter built into a fuel, oil or water piping system and it is used to remove large particles of dirt and debris. The duplex features a design that makes strainer basket servicing a no-hassle operation. The duplex strainer system usually consists of two separate strainer baskets housings. The system also contains a valve handle placed between the two baskets to divert the flow of liquid to one strainer while the other is being cleaned. On some strainers, the valve will work automatically and the strainer will perform a self-cleaning operation.

These types of strainers are installed in pipeline systems where flow cannot be stopped. Depending upon their NB size they are capable of filtration up to 40 μm. Basket Strainers find use in industries where impurities are mostly solids. Unlike other types of strainers, it is easy to conduct maintenance on these strainers.

Duplex strainers are mainly used in various industries such as process industry, power industry, chemical industry, oil and gas industry, pulp and paper industry, pharmaceutical industry, metals and mining industry, water and waste management, fire fighting industry, refineries and petrochemical plants. Strainers are used to remove hazardous elements that might cause partial or complete breakdown of operations if they get into the system.
