= Armstrong process =

The Armstrong process is used to refine titanium. Its output is particle-sized dust which can be sprayed into pattern-molds. It was patented in 1999. The output of this process has a "coral-like morphology", which differs from the traditional outputs like "spherical gas-atomized powder, mechanically crushed angular particles, or the titanium sponge morphology created during the Kroll process."

== History ==
The Armstrong process was patented in 1999.

In 2016 a paper by MacDonald et al. told that the Armstrong powder was produced directly from the reduction of Titanium tetrachloride "in a continuous liquid loop", and cost only "11-24 USD/kg", or roughly an order of magnitude higher than the price of steel.

== Description ==
The reducing agent for the Armstrong process is sodium, which is liquefied and introduced in a combined stream with titanium tetrachloride.

$$\ce{{TiCl4} + 4{Na} ->[98~^{\circ}\mathrm{C}]{Ti} + 4{NaCl}}$$
