= Grainer evaporation process =

Method of producing salt

The Grainer evaporation process is a method of producing salt.

This method uses shallow open pans with steam-heated immersion coils to evaporate the brine into salt.

Sometimes it is paired with a partial-vacuum, to speed evaporation.

== See also ==
- Alberger process
