= Matthew Hunter =

New Zealand metallurgist

Matthew A. Hunter
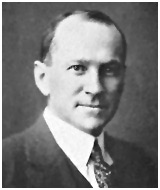
- Born: 1878; Auckland, New Zealand
- Died: March 24, 1961 (aged 82–83); Troy, New York, United States
- Known for: Hunter process
- Spouse: Mary Pond
- Scientific career
- Fields: Metallurgy

Matthew Albert Hunter (1878–1961) was a metallurgist and inventor of the Hunter process for producing titanium metal.

Hunter was born in Auckland, New Zealand, in 1878 and received his early education in local public schools. He completed his Secondary education at Auckland Grammar School. He attended Auckland University College, where he earned his Bachelor's in 1900, and his Master's degree in 1902, and later studied at University College, London, earning a Doctor of Science degree, and at various other European universities. He met his future wife, Mary Pond, in Europe, as a fellow student, and married after traveling to America. He became employed at the research laboratories of General Electric, where he began his research into Titanium. Following the recession of 1908, he left GE and became a professor of Electrical Engineering at Rensselaer Polytechnic Institute in Troy, New York.

== Background ==
Titanium was identified in 1791 by William Gregor but proved difficult to isolate. It was isolated to 95% purity by Lars Nilson and Otto Pettersson, and later isolated to 98% purity by Henri Moissan using an electric furnace. In 1910, Hunter produced 99.9% pure titanium in a method that became known as the Hunter Process. The process involves heating titanium tetrachloride with metallic sodium in an airtight steel cylinder known as a "metal bomb". Because of the dangers of elemental sodium and the high temperatures and pressures involved, many of the experiments were done outside on the football field of the RPI campus. Hunter believed titanium might have a high melting point and would be able to replace the carbon filaments used in light bulbs at the time. It turned out titanium’s melting point was not high enough for application in light bulbs, but he discovered other useful properties of the metal. The Hunter process is very inefficient, and is not able to produce large amounts of titanium, so production of titanium remained mainly confined to the laboratory until the more efficient Kroll process was developed in the 1940s. The Hunter process remains of use only in the most demanding applications where high purity is needed.

Hunter served for five years as head of the Department of Electrical Engineering, and helped found the Department of Metallurgical Engineering. He served as head of the Department of Metallurgical Engineering from 1935 to 1947 and became Dean of Faculty in 1943. The department of Metallurgical Engineering was eventually transformed into the Department of Materials Engineering. He received an honorary doctorate from RPI in 1949. In 1959, Hunter received the Gold Medal of the American Society of Metals in recognition of a lifetime devoted to advancing metallurgical and engineering education. The Matthew Albert Hunter Prize in Metallurgical Engineering was established at RPI in 1951.

He died March 24, 1961, in Troy at the age of 82. He was inducted into RPI's Alumni Hall of Fame in 2009.
