= Titanium =

Titanium, _{22}Ti
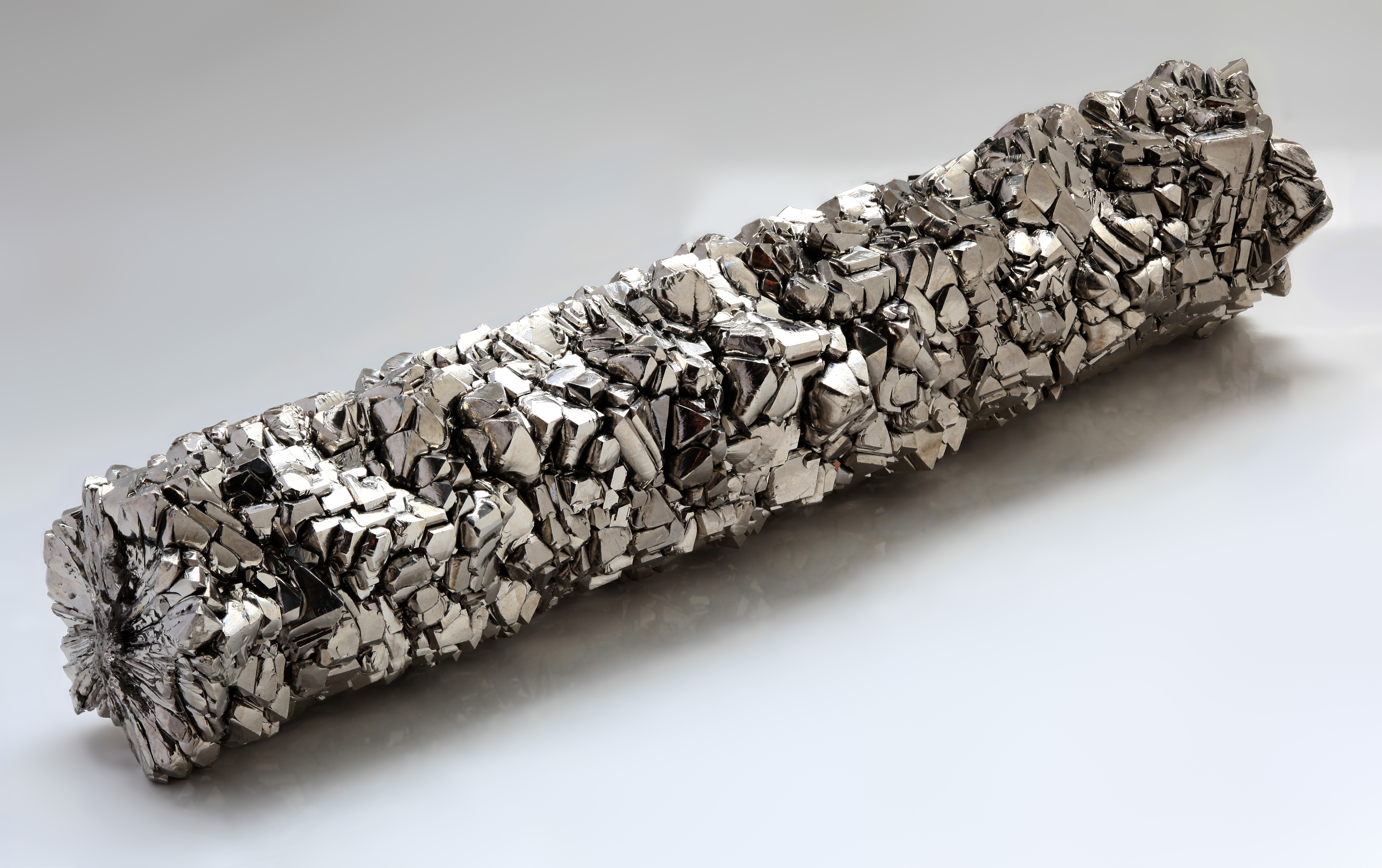

Titanium
- Pronunciation: /taɪˈteɪniəm/ (ty-TAY-nee-əm); /təˈteɪniəm/ (tə-TAY-nee-əm)
- Appearance: silvery grey-white metallic

Standard atomic weight A_{r}°(Ti)
- 47.867±0.001; 47.867±0.001 (abridged)

Titanium in the periodic table
Hydrogen																															Helium
Lithium	Beryllium																									Boron	Carbon	Nitrogen	Oxygen	Fluorine	Neon
Sodium	Magnesium																									Aluminium	Silicon	Phosphorus	Sulfur	Chlorine	Argon
Potassium	Calcium															Scandium	Titanium	Vanadium	Chromium	Manganese	Iron	Cobalt	Nickel	Copper	Zinc	Gallium	Germanium	Arsenic	Selenium	Bromine	Krypton
Rubidium	Strontium															Yttrium	Zirconium	Niobium	Molybdenum	Technetium	Ruthenium	Rhodium	Palladium	Silver	Cadmium	Indium	Tin	Antimony	Tellurium	Iodine	Xenon
Caesium	Barium	Lanthanum	Cerium	Praseodymium	Neodymium	Promethium	Samarium	Europium	Gadolinium	Terbium	Dysprosium	Holmium	Erbium	Thulium	Ytterbium	Lutetium	Hafnium	Tantalum	Tungsten	Rhenium	Osmium	Iridium	Platinum	Gold	Mercury (element)	Thallium	Lead	Bismuth	Polonium	Astatine	Radon
Francium	Radium	Actinium	Thorium	Protactinium	Uranium	Neptunium	Plutonium	Americium	Curium	Berkelium	Californium	Einsteinium	Fermium	Mendelevium	Nobelium	Lawrencium	Rutherfordium	Dubnium	Seaborgium	Bohrium	Hassium	Meitnerium	Darmstadtium	Roentgenium	Copernicium	Nihonium	Flerovium	Moscovium	Livermorium	Tennessine	Oganesson
–
↑
Ti
↓
Zr
scandium ← titanium → vanadium
- Atomic number (Z): 22
- Group: group 4
- Period: period 4
- Block: d-block
- Electron configuration: [Ar] 3d^{2} 4s^{2}
- Electrons per shell: 2, 8, 10, 2

Physical properties
- Phase at STP: solid
- Melting point: 1941 K (1668 °C, 3034 °F)
- Boiling point: 3560 K (3287 °C, 5949 °F)
- Density (at 20° C): 4.502 g/cm^{3}
- (near r.t.): 4.322 g/cm^{3} ^{46}Ti
- when liquid (at m.p.): 4.11 g/cm^{3}
- Heat of fusion: 14.15 kJ/mol
- Heat of vaporization: 425 kJ/mol
- Molar heat capacity: 25.060 J/(mol·K)
- Specific heat capacity: 523.534 J/(kg·K)
Vapor pressure
P (Pa)	1	10	100	1 k	10 k	100 k
at T (K)	1982	2171	(2403)	2692	3064	3558

Atomic properties
- Oxidation states: common: +4 −2, −1, 0, +1, +2, +3
- Electronegativity: Pauling scale: 1.54
- Ionization energies: 1st: 658.8 kJ/mol; 2nd: 1309.8 kJ/mol; 3rd: 2652.5 kJ/mol; (more)
- Atomic radius: empirical: 147 pm
- Covalent radius: 160±8 pm
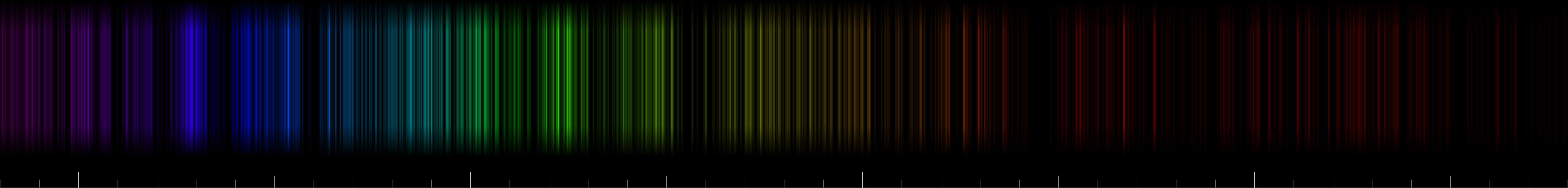
- Spectral lines of titanium

Other properties
- Natural occurrence: primordial
- Crystal structure: hexagonal close-packed (hcp) (hP2)
- Lattice constants: a = 295.05 pm c = 468.33 pm (at 20 °C)
- Thermal expansion: 9.68×10^{−6}/K (at 20 °C) (Note: The thermal expansion is anisotropic: the coefficients for each crystal axis are (at 20 °C): α_{a} = 9.48×10^{−6}/K, α_{c} = 10.06×10^{−6}/K, and α_{average} = α_{V}/3 = 9.68×10^{−6}/K.)
- Thermal conductivity: 21.9 W/(m⋅K)
- Electrical resistivity: 420 nΩ⋅m (at 20 °C)
- Magnetic ordering: paramagnetic
- Molar magnetic susceptibility: +153.0×10^{−6} cm^{3}/mol (293 K)
- Young's modulus: 120 GPa
- Shear modulus: 44 GPa
- Bulk modulus: 110 GPa
- Speed of sound thin rod: 5090 m/s (at r.t.)
- Poisson ratio: 0.361
- Mohs hardness: 6.0
- Vickers hardness: 830–3420 MPa
- Brinell hardness: 716–2770 MPa
- CAS Number: 7440-32-6

History
- Naming: after the Titans of Greek mythology
- Discovery: William Gregor (1791)
- First isolation: Jöns Jakob Berzelius (1825)
- Named by: Martin Heinrich Klaproth (1795)

Isotopes of titanium
Main isotopes			Decay	
Isotope	abundance	half-life (t_{1/2})	mode	product
^{44}Ti	synth	59.1 y	ε	^{44}Sc
^{45}Ti	synth	3.08 h	β^{+}	^{45}Sc
^{46}Ti	8.25%	stable		
^{47}Ti	7.44%	stable		
^{48}Ti	73.72%	stable		
^{49}Ti	5.41%	stable		
^{50}Ti	5.18%	stable		

Titanium is a chemical element with the chemical symbol Ti and the atomic number 22. Found in nature only as an oxide, it can be reduced to produce a lustrous transition metal with a silver color, low density, and high strength that is resistant to corrosion in sea water, aqua regia, and chlorine.

Titanium was discovered in Cornwall, Great Britain, by William Gregor in 1791 and was named by Martin Heinrich Klaproth after the Titans of Greek mythology. The element occurs within a number of minerals, principally rutile and ilmenite, which are widely distributed in the Earth's crust and lithosphere; it is found in almost all living things, as well as bodies of water, rocks, and soils. The metal is extracted from its principal mineral ores by the Kroll and Hunter processes. The most common compound, titanium dioxide (TiO_{2}), is a popular photocatalyst and is used in the manufacture of white pigments. Other compounds include titanium tetrachloride (TiCl_{4}), a component of smoke screens and catalysts; and titanium trichloride (TiCl_{3}), which is used as a catalyst in the production of polypropylene.

Titanium can be alloyed with iron, aluminium, vanadium, and molybdenum, among other elements. The resulting titanium alloys are strong, lightweight, and versatile, with applications including aerospace (jet engines, missiles, and spacecraft), military, industrial processes (chemicals and petrochemicals, desalination plants, pulp, and paper), automotive, agriculture (farming), sporting goods such as golf clubs, jewelry, and consumer electronics. Titanium is also considered one of the most biocompatible metals, leading to a range of medical applications including prostheses, orthopedic implants, dental implants, and surgical instruments.

The two most useful properties of the metal are its corrosion resistance and tensile-strength-to-density ratio, the highest of any metallic element, although resistance to tensile stress does not mean it has the highest ratio for other stresses: bulk compression, shear, and pressure wave. In its unalloyed condition, titanium is as tensile-strong as some steels, but less dense. There are two allotropic forms and five naturally occurring isotopes of this element, ^{46}Ti through ^{50}Ti, with ^{48}Ti being the most abundant (73.8%).

== Characteristics ==
=== Physical properties ===
As a metal, titanium is recognized for its high strength-to-weight ratio, which by definition refers to tensile strength. It is a strong metal with low density that is quite ductile (especially in an oxygen-free environment), lustrous, and metallic-white in color. Due to its relatively high melting point (1,668 °C or 3,034 °F) it has sometimes been described as a refractory metal, but this is not the case. It is paramagnetic and has fairly low electrical and thermal conductivity compared to other metals. Titanium is superconducting when cooled below its critical temperature of 0.49 K.

Commercially pure (99.2% pure) grades of titanium have an ultimate tensile strength of about 434 MPa (63,000 psi), equal to that of common, low-grade steel alloys, but are less dense. Titanium is 60% denser than aluminium, but more than twice as strong as the most commonly used 6061-T6 aluminium alloy. Certain titanium alloys (e.g., Beta C) achieve tensile strengths of over 1,400 MPa (200,000 psi). However, titanium loses strength when heated above 430 °C (806 °F).

Titanium is not as hard as some grades of heat-treated steel; it is non-magnetic and a poor conductor of heat and electricity. Machining requires precautions, because the material can gall unless sharp tools and proper cooling methods are used. Like steel structures, those made from titanium have a fatigue limit that guarantees longevity in some applications.

The metal is a dimorphic allotrope of a hexagonal close packed α form that changes into a body-centered cubic (lattice) β form at 882 °C (1,620 °F). The specific heat of the α form increases dramatically as it is heated to this transition temperature but then falls and remains fairly constant for the β form regardless of temperature.

=== Chemical properties ===
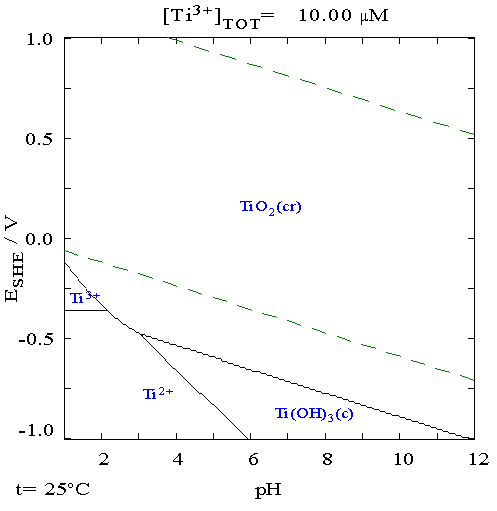
Pourbaix diagram for titanium in pure water, perchloric acid, or sodium hydroxide

Like aluminium and magnesium, the surface of titanium metal and its alloys oxidizes immediately upon exposure to air to form a thin non-porous passivation layer that protects the bulk metal from further oxidation or corrosion. When it first forms, this protective layer is only 1–2 nm thick, but it continues to grow slowly, reaching a thickness of 25 nm in four years. This layer gives titanium excellent resistance to corrosion against oxidizing acids, but it will dissolve in dilute hydrofluoric acid, hot hydrochloric acid, and hot sulfuric acid.

Titanium is capable of withstanding attack by dilute sulfuric and hydrochloric acids at room temperature, chloride solutions, and most organic acids. However, titanium is corroded by concentrated acids. Titanium burns in normal air at temperatures lower than its melting point, so melting the metal is possible only in an inert atmosphere or vacuum. At room temperature, titanium is fairly inert to halogens, but will violently combine with chlorine and bromine at 550 °C (1,022 °F) to form titanium tetrachloride and titanium tetrabromide, respectively.

Titanium readily reacts with oxygen at 1,200 °C (2,190 °F) in air, and at 610 °C (1,130 °F) in pure oxygen, forming titanium dioxide. This oxide is also formed by reaction between titanium and pure oxygen at room temperature and pressure of 25 bars (2,500 kPa). Titanium is one of the few elements that burns in pure nitrogen gas, reacting at 800 °C (1,470 °F) to form titanium nitride, which causes embrittlement.

=== Occurrence ===
Titanium is the ninth-most abundant element in Earth's crust (0.63% by mass) and the seventh-most abundant metal. It is present as oxides in most igneous rocks, in sediments derived from them, in living things, and natural bodies of water. Of the 801 types of igneous rocks analyzed by the United States Geological Survey, 784 contained titanium. Its proportion in soils is approximately 0.5–1.5%.

Common titanium-containing minerals are anatase, brookite, ilmenite, perovskite, rutile, and titanite (sphene). Akaogiite is an extremely rare mineral consisting of titanium dioxide. Of these minerals, only rutile and ilmenite have economic importance, yet even they are difficult to find in high concentrations. About 6.0 and 0.7 million tonnes of those minerals were mined in 2011, respectively. Significant titanium-bearing ilmenite deposits exist in Australia, Canada, China, India, Mozambique, New Zealand, Norway, Sierra Leone, South Africa, and Ukraine. Total reserves of anatase, ilmenite, and rutile are estimated to exceed 2 billion tonnes.

The concentration of titanium is about 4 picomolar in the ocean. At 100 °C, the concentration of titanium in water is estimated to be less than 10^{−7} M at pH 7. The identity of titanium species in aqueous solution remains unknown because of its low solubility and the lack of sensitive spectroscopic methods, although only the 4+ oxidation state is stable in air. No evidence exists for a biological role, although rare organisms are known to accumulate high concentrations of titanium.

Titanium is contained in meteorites, and it has been detected in the Sun and in M-type stars (the coolest type) with a surface temperature of 3,200 °C (5,790 °F). Rocks brought back from the Moon during the Apollo 17 mission are composed of 12.1% TiO_{2}. Native titanium is only found in rocks that have been exposed to pressures between roughly 2.8 to 4.0 gigapascal on Earth, but it has been identified in nanocrystals on the Moon.

=== Isotopes ===
Naturally occurring titanium is composed of five stable isotopes: ^{46}Ti, ^{47}Ti, ^{48}Ti, ^{49}Ti, and ^{50}Ti, with ^{48}Ti being the most abundant (73.8% natural abundance). Twenty-three radioisotopes have been characterized, (Note: Twenty-one radioisotopes were known as of 2021 with the publication of the NUBASE2020 nuclear data library, with two more radioisotopes, ^{65}Ti and ^{66}Ti being discovered in 2025.) the most stable of which are ^{44}Ti with a half-life of 63 years; ^{45}Ti, 184.8 minutes; ^{51}Ti, 5.76 minutes; and ^{52}Ti, 1.7 minutes. All other radioactive isotopes have half-lives less than 33 seconds, with the majority less than half a second.

The isotopes of titanium range from ^{39}Ti to ^{66}Ti. The primary decay mode for isotopes lighter than ^{46}Ti is positron emission (with the exception of ^{44}Ti, which undergoes electron capture), leading to isotopes of scandium, and the primary mode for isotopes heavier than ^{50}Ti is beta emission, leading to isotopes of vanadium. Titanium becomes radioactive upon bombardment with deuterons, emitting mainly positrons and hard gamma rays.

== Compounds ==
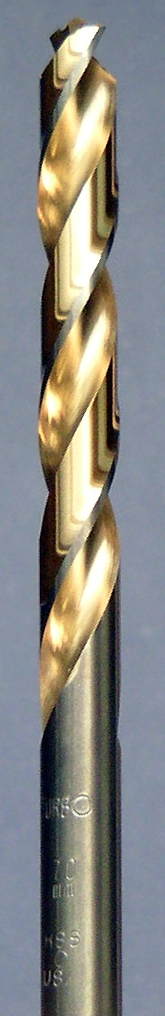
A titanium nitride-coated drill bit

The +4 oxidation state dominates titanium chemistry, but compounds in the +3 oxidation state are also numerous. Commonly, titanium adopts an octahedral coordination geometry in its complexes, but tetrahedral TiCl_{4} is a notable exception. Because of its high oxidation state, titanium(IV) compounds exhibit a high degree of covalent bonding.

=== Oxides, sulfides, and alkoxides ===
The most important oxide is TiO_{2}, which exists in three important polymorphs; anatase, brookite, and rutile. All three are white diamagnetic solids, although mineral samples can appear dark, as in rutile. They adopt polymeric structures in which Ti is surrounded by six oxide ligands that link to other Ti centers.

The term titanates usually refers to titanium(IV) compounds, as represented by barium titanate (BaTiO_{3}). With a perovskite structure, this material exhibits piezoelectric properties and is used as a transducer in the interconversion of sound and electricity. Many minerals are titanates, such as ilmenite (FeTiO_{3}). Star sapphires and rubies get their asterism (star-forming shine) from the presence of titanium dioxide impurities.

A variety of reduced oxides (suboxides) of titanium are known, mainly reduced stoichiometries of titanium dioxide obtained by atmospheric plasma spraying. Ti_{3}O_{5}, described as a Ti(IV)-Ti(III) species, is a purple semiconductor produced by reduction of TiO_{2} with hydrogen at high temperatures, and is used industrially when surfaces need to be vapor-coated with titanium dioxide: it evaporates as pure TiO, whereas TiO_{2} evaporates as a mixture of oxides and deposits coatings with variable refractive index. Also known is Ti_{2}O_{3}, with the corundum structure, and TiO, with the rock salt structure, although often nonstoichiometric.

The alkoxides of titanium(IV), prepared by treating TiCl_{4} with alcohols, are colorless compounds that convert to the dioxide on reaction with water. They are industrially useful for depositing solid TiO_{2} via the sol-gel process. Titanium isopropoxide is used in the synthesis of chiral organic compounds via the Sharpless epoxidation.

Titanium forms a variety of sulfides, but only TiS_{2} has attracted significant interest. It adopts a layered structure and was used as a cathode in the development of lithium batteries. Because Ti(IV) is a "hard cation," the sulfides of titanium are unstable and tend to hydrolyze to the oxide with release of hydrogen sulfide.

=== Nitrides and carbides ===
Titanium nitride (TiN) is a refractory solid exhibiting extreme hardness, thermal/electrical conductivity, and a high melting point. TiN has a hardness equivalent to sapphire and carborundum (9.0 on the Mohs scale), and is often used to coat cutting tools, such as drill bits. It is also used as a gold-colored decorative finish and as a barrier layer in semiconductor fabrication. Titanium carbide (TiC), which is also very hard, is found in cutting tools and coatings.

=== Halides ===
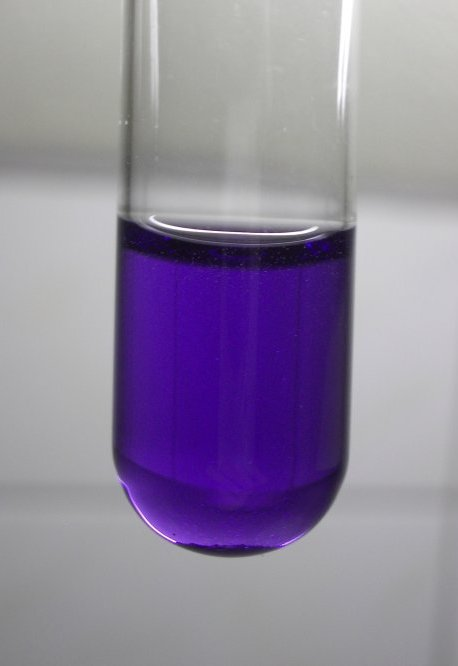
Titanium(III) compounds are characteristically violet, illustrated by this aqueous solution of titanium trichloride.

Titanium tetrachloride (titanium(IV) chloride, TiCl_{4}) is a colorless volatile liquid (commercial samples are yellowish) that, in air, hydrolyzes with spectacular emission of white clouds. Via the Kroll process, TiCl_{4} is used in the conversion of titanium ores to titanium metal. Titanium tetrachloride is also used to make titanium dioxide, e.g., for use in white paint. It is widely used in organic chemistry as a Lewis acid, for example in the Mukaiyama aldol condensation. In the van Arkel–de Boer process, titanium tetraiodide (TiI_{4}) is generated in the production of high purity titanium metal.

Titanium(III) and titanium(II) also form stable chlorides. A notable example is titanium(III) chloride (TiCl_{3}), which is used as a catalyst for production of polyolefins (see Ziegler–Natta catalyst) and a reducing agent in organic chemistry.

=== Organometallic complexes ===
Owing to the important role of titanium compounds as polymerization catalyst, compounds with Ti–C bonds have been intensively studied. The most common organotitanium complex is titanocene dichloride ((C_{5}H_{5})_{2}TiCl_{2}). Related compounds include Tebbe's reagent and Petasis reagent. Titanium forms carbonyl complexes, e.g. (C_{5}H_{5})_{2}Ti(CO)_{2}.

== History ==
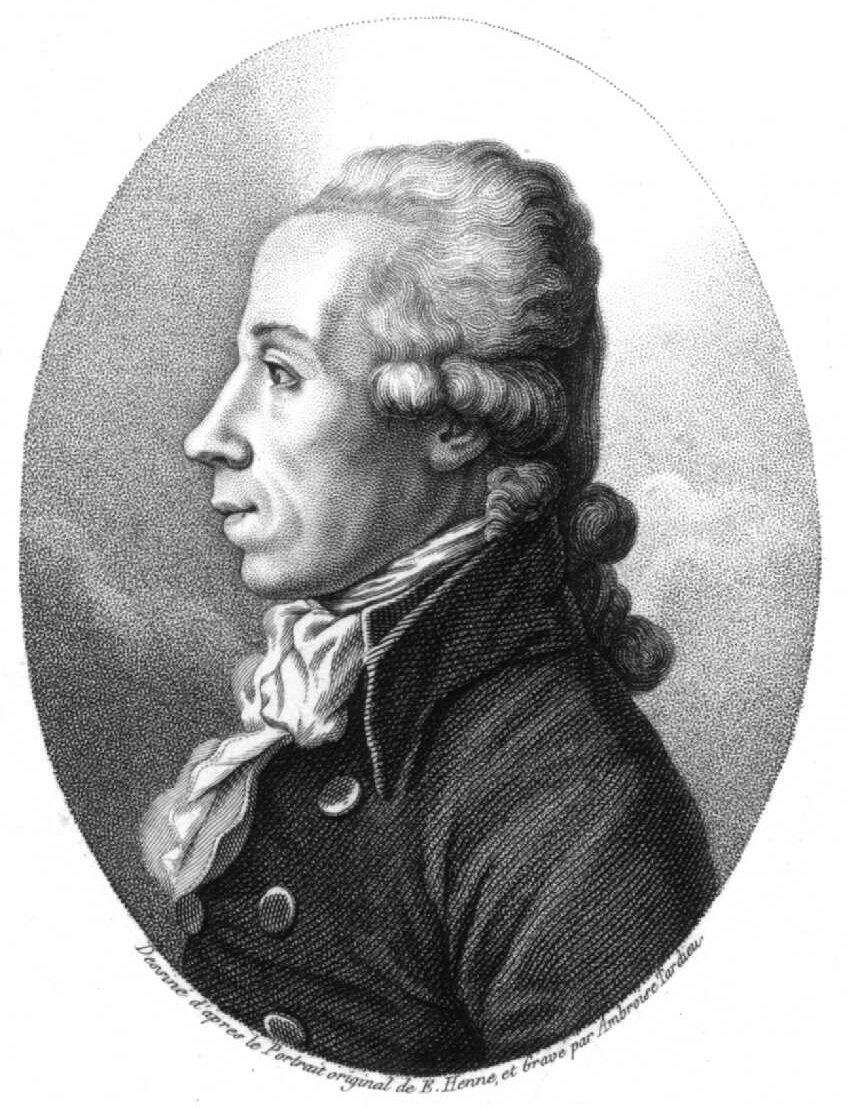
Martin Heinrich Klaproth named titanium for the Titans of Greek mythology.

Titanium was discovered in 1791 by the clergyman and geologist William Gregor as an inclusion of a mineral in Cornwall, Great Britain. Gregor recognized the presence of a new element in ilmenite when he found black sand by a stream and noticed the sand was attracted by a magnet. Analyzing the sand, he determined the presence of two metal oxides: iron oxide (explaining the attraction to the magnet) and 45.25% of a white metallic oxide he could not identify. Realizing that the unidentified oxide contained a metal that did not match any known element, in 1791 Gregor reported his findings in both German and French science journals: Crell's Annalen and Observations et Mémoires sur la Physique. He named this oxide manaccanite.

Around the same time, Franz-Joseph Müller von Reichenstein produced a similar substance, but could not identify it. The oxide was independently rediscovered in 1795 by Prussian chemist Martin Heinrich Klaproth in rutile from Boinik (the German name of Bajmócska), a village in Hungary (now Bojničky in Slovakia). (Note: "Diesem zufolge will ich den Namen für die gegenwärtige metallische Substanz, gleichergestalt wie bei dem Uranium geschehen, aus der Mythologie, und zwar von den Ursöhnen der Erde, den Titanen, entlehnen, und benenne also diese neue Metallgeschlecht: Titanium; ... " [By virtue of this I will derive the name for the present metallic substance — as happened similarly in the case of uranium — from mythology, namely from the first sons of the Earth, the Titans, and thus [I] name this new species of metal: "titanium"; ... ]) Klaproth found that it contained a new element and named it for the Titans of Greek mythology. After hearing about Gregor's earlier discovery, he obtained a sample of manaccanite and confirmed that it contained titanium.

The currently known processes for extracting titanium from its various ores are laborious and costly; it is not possible to reduce the ore by heating with carbon (as in iron smelting) because titanium combines with the carbon to produce titanium carbide. An extraction of 95% pure titanium was achieved by Lars Fredrik Nilson and Otto Petterson. To achieve this they chlorinated titanium oxide in a carbon monoxide atmosphere with chlorine gas before reducing it to titanium metal by the use of sodium. Pure metallic titanium (99.9%) was first prepared in 1910 by Matthew A. Hunter at Rensselaer Polytechnic Institute by heating titanium tetrachloride (TiCl_{4}) with sodium at 700–800 °C (1,292–1,472 °F) under great pressure in a batch process known as the Hunter process. Titanium metal was not used outside the laboratory until 1932 when William Justin Kroll produced it by reducing TiCl_{4} with calcium. Eight years later he refined this process with magnesium and with sodium in what became known as the Kroll process. Although research continues to seek cheaper and more efficient routes, such as the FFC Cambridge process, the Kroll process is still predominantly used for commercial production.

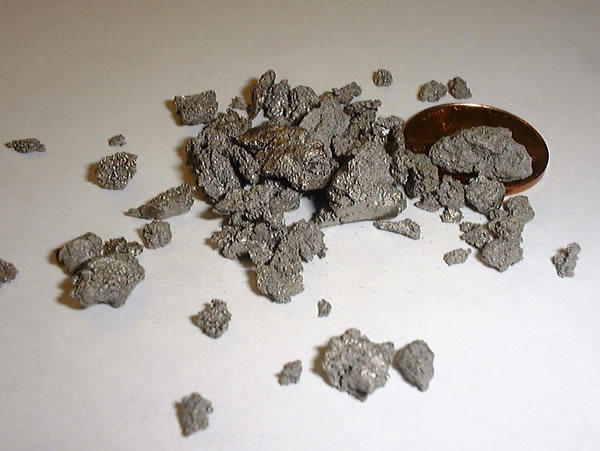
Titanium "sponge" made by the Kroll process

Titanium of very high purity was made in small quantities when Anton Eduard van Arkel and Jan Hendrik de Boer discovered the iodide process in 1925, by reacting with iodine and decomposing the formed vapors over a hot filament to pure metal.

In the 1950s and 1960s, the Soviet Union pioneered the use of titanium in military and submarine applications (Alfa class, Mike class and Sierra II class) as part of programs related to the Cold War. Starting in the early 1950s, titanium came into use extensively in military aviation, particularly in high-performance jets, starting with aircraft such as the F-100 Super Sabre and Lockheed A-12 and SR-71.

Throughout the Cold War period, titanium was considered a strategic material by the U.S. government, and a large stockpile of titanium sponge (a porous form of the pure metal) was maintained by the Defense National Stockpile Center, until the stockpile was dispersed in the 2000s. Even so, the U.S. government annually allocates 15,000 metric tons of titanium sponge as potential acquisitions for the stockpile.

== Production ==
Titanium production

2024 production of ilmenite and rutile
Country	thousand tonnes	% of total
China (Note: Country reports only produced ilmenite)	3,300	35.3
Mozambique	1,908	20.4
South Africa	1,400	15.0
Australia	600	6.4
Norway	360	3.8
Canada	350	3.7
Senegal	300	3.2
Madagascar	240	2.6
India	222	2.4
Ukraine	130	1.4
United States	100	1.1
Sierra Leone (Note: Country reports only produced rutile)	60	0.6
Kenya	40	0.4
Other countries	350	3.7
World	9,360	100

Titanium production is largely divided into three measured categories: manufacture of porous titanium metal "sponge" titanium oxide pigment, and titanium mineral concentrates used for the production of sponge, pigment, metal ingots, and other titanium products such as coatings. These concentrates are largely made up of the mineral ilmenite, but also include anatase, natural and synthetic rutile, tailings, slag, and leucoxene. As of 2024, the largest producers of titanium mineral concentrates were China, Mozambique, and South Africa.

Most of the world's titanium is produced in China. The United States Geological Survey's 2025 report on mineral commodities estimated that out of the 320,000 metric tons (310,000 long tons) of titanium sponge produced globally in 2024, 220,000 (69%) were produced in China, with the second-largest producer being Japan (which produced 55,000 metric tons in the same year, 17% of the total). Japan was the largest exporter of titanium sponge in 2024, but did not produce any titanium minerals on its own. A prior report in 2021 noted that the four leading producers of titanium sponge were China (52%), Japan (24%), Russia (16%) and Kazakhstan (7%). Russia remains the third-largest producer of titanium sponge through the efforts of the metallurgy company VSMPO-AVISMA, despite international sanctions during the Russian invasion of Ukraine. Production statistics on titanium dioxide pigment are not as clear-cut, but estimates placed the maximum capacity on global pigment production at 9,800,000 metric tons (9,600,000 long tons) in 2024.

Various methods have been developed to extract and refine titanium from ore since the metal was first purified in 1910.

=== Mineral beneficiation processes ===
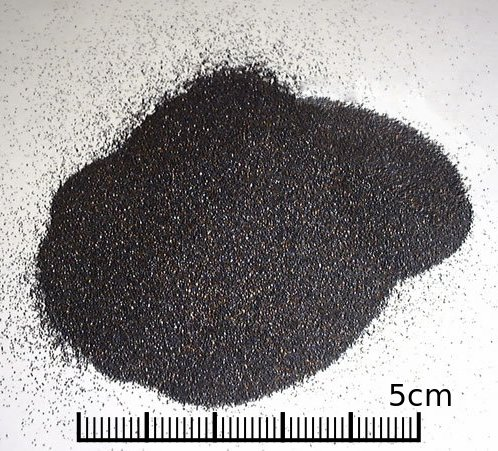
Mineral concentrate of fine-grained titanium

Several processes have been developed to extract titanium and usable titanium-containing minerals from ore. The Becher process is an industrial process used to produce synthetic rutile, a form of titanium dioxide, from the ore ilmenite by removing iron. It is not used at scale. The chloride process produces titanium tetrachloride through treatment of rutile ore with chlorine and carbon at high heat, then oxidizes the product with an oxygen flame or plasma to produce titanium dioxide. The sulfate process uses sulfuric acid (H_{2}SO_{4}) to leach titanium from ilmenite ore (FeTiO_{3}), producing titanyl sulfate (TiOSO_{4}). This sulfate is broken into two hydrates, TiO_{2} and H_{2}SO_{4}, through addition of water, and this water is removed by adding heat, which produces titanium dioxide as the end product.

=== Purification processes ===
==== Hunter process ====
The Hunter process was the first industrial process to produce pure metallic titanium. It was invented in 1910 by Matthew A. Hunter, a chemist born in New Zealand who worked in the United States. The process involves reducing titanium tetrachloride (TiCl_{4}) with sodium (Na) in a batch reactor with an inert atmosphere at a temperature of 1,000 °C. Dilute hydrochloric acid is then used to leach the salt from the product.

TiCl_{4}(g) + 4 Na(l) → 4 NaCl(l) + Ti(s)

==== Kroll process ====
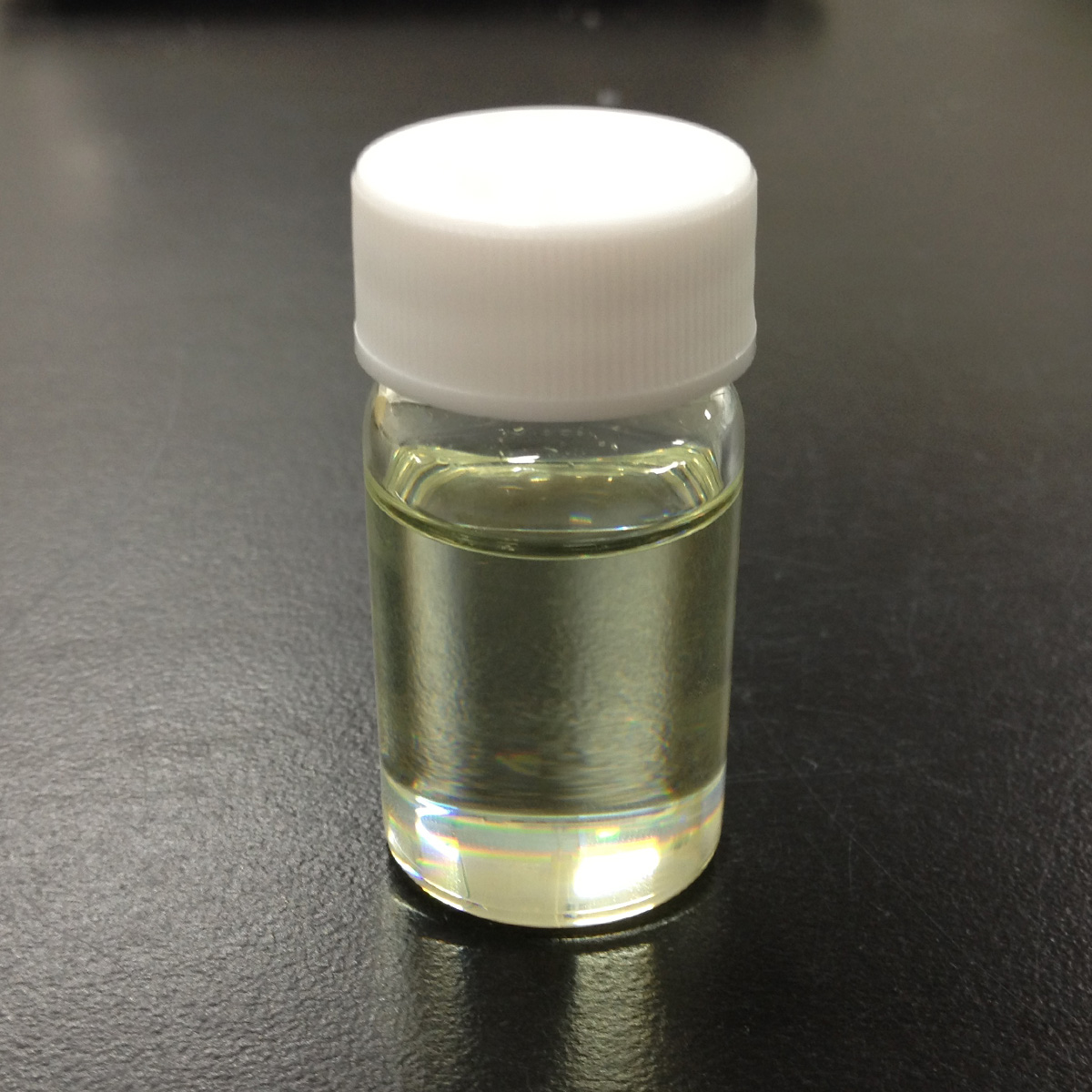
Sample of titanium tetrachloride, a volatile liquid

The processing of titanium metal occurs in four major steps: reduction of titanium ore into "sponge," a porous form; melting of sponge, or sponge plus a master alloy to form an ingot; primary fabrication, where an ingot is converted into general mill products such as billet, bar, plate, sheet, strip, and tube; and secondary fabrication of finished shapes from mill products.

Because it cannot be readily produced by reduction of titanium dioxide, titanium metal is obtained by reduction of titanium tetrachloride (TiCl_{4}) with magnesium metal in the Kroll process. The complexity of this batch production in the Kroll process explains the relatively high market value of titanium, despite the Kroll process being less expensive than the Hunter process. To produce the TiCl_{4} required by the Kroll process, the dioxide is subjected to carbothermic reduction in the presence of chlorine. In this process, the chlorine gas is passed over a red-hot mixture of rutile or ilmenite in the presence of carbon. After extensive purification by fractional distillation, the TiCl_{4} is reduced with 800 °C (1,470 °F) molten magnesium in an argon atmosphere.

2 FeTiO_{3} + 7 Cl_{2} + 6 C $\ce{->[900^oC]}$ 2 FeCl_{3} + 2 TiCl_{4} + 6 CO
TiCl_{4} + 2 Mg $\ce{->[1100^oC]}$ Ti + 2 MgCl_{2}

==== Arkel-Boer process ====
The van Arkel–de Boer process was the first semi-industrial process developed to produce pure titanium, invented by Anton Eduard van Arkel and Jan Hendrik de Boer in 1925 for the electronics company Philips. It is a closed-loop process that involves thermal decomposition of titanium tetraiodide. This same process is used to purify other metals, such as thorium, hafnium, and zirconium, and a similar process using further refined iodide was used to refine chromium. A desire to develop processes that could be run continuously led to the development of commercial processes to refine titanium.

==== Armstrong process ====
Titanium powder is manufactured using a flow production process known as the Armstrong process that is similar to the batch production Hunter process. A stream of titanium tetrachloride gas is added to a stream of molten sodium; the products (sodium chloride salt and titanium particles) are filtered from the extra sodium. Titanium is then separated from the salt by water washing. Both the sodium and chlorine are recycled to produce and process more titanium tetrachloride.

==== Other processes ====
The titanium tetrachloride used as an intermediate in both the Hunter and Kroll process is a volatile and corrosive liquid, and is thus hazardous to work with. The processes involving the tetrachloride, both its formation and the vacuum distillation processes used to purify the final material, are slow, and have prompted development of other techniques.

Methods for electrolytic production of Ti metal from TiO_{2} using molten salt electrolytes have been proposed starting in the 1990s, and have been researched and tested at laboratory and small pilot plant scales. While some metals such as nickel and copper can be refined by electrowinning at room temperature, titanium must be in the molten state, which is likely to damage the refractory lining of a reaction vessel. Zhang and colleagues concluded in 2017 that despite industry interests in finding new ways to manufacture titanium metal, no method had yet been developed to commercially replace the Kroll process. One manufacturer in Virginia has developed a method to recycle scrap titanium metal back into powder, though their scale remains small, having the goal of producing only 125 tons of titanium per year as of 2025.

One method that has been developed to potentially supplant the Kroll process is known as hydrogen-assisted magnesiothermic reduction and makes use of magnesium, hydrochloric acid, and a hydrogen atmosphere to directly reduce titanium dioxide to pure titanium. The reduction of titanium dioxide powder by magnesium in an atomphere of hydrogen can be followed by a leaching step with hydrochloric acid, which removes magnesium and residual non-titanium oxides. This is followed by additional reduction and leaching steps, and eventually results in pure titanium powder or titanium hydride.

=== Fabrication ===
All welding of titanium must be done in an inert atmosphere of argon or helium to shield it from contamination with atmospheric gases (oxygen, nitrogen, and hydrogen). Contamination causes a variety of conditions, such as embrittlement, which reduce the integrity of the assembly welds and lead to joint failure.

Titanium is very difficult to solder directly, and hence a solderable metal or alloy such as steel is coated on titanium prior to soldering. Titanium metal can be machined with the same equipment and the same processes as stainless steel.

==== Titanium alloys ====
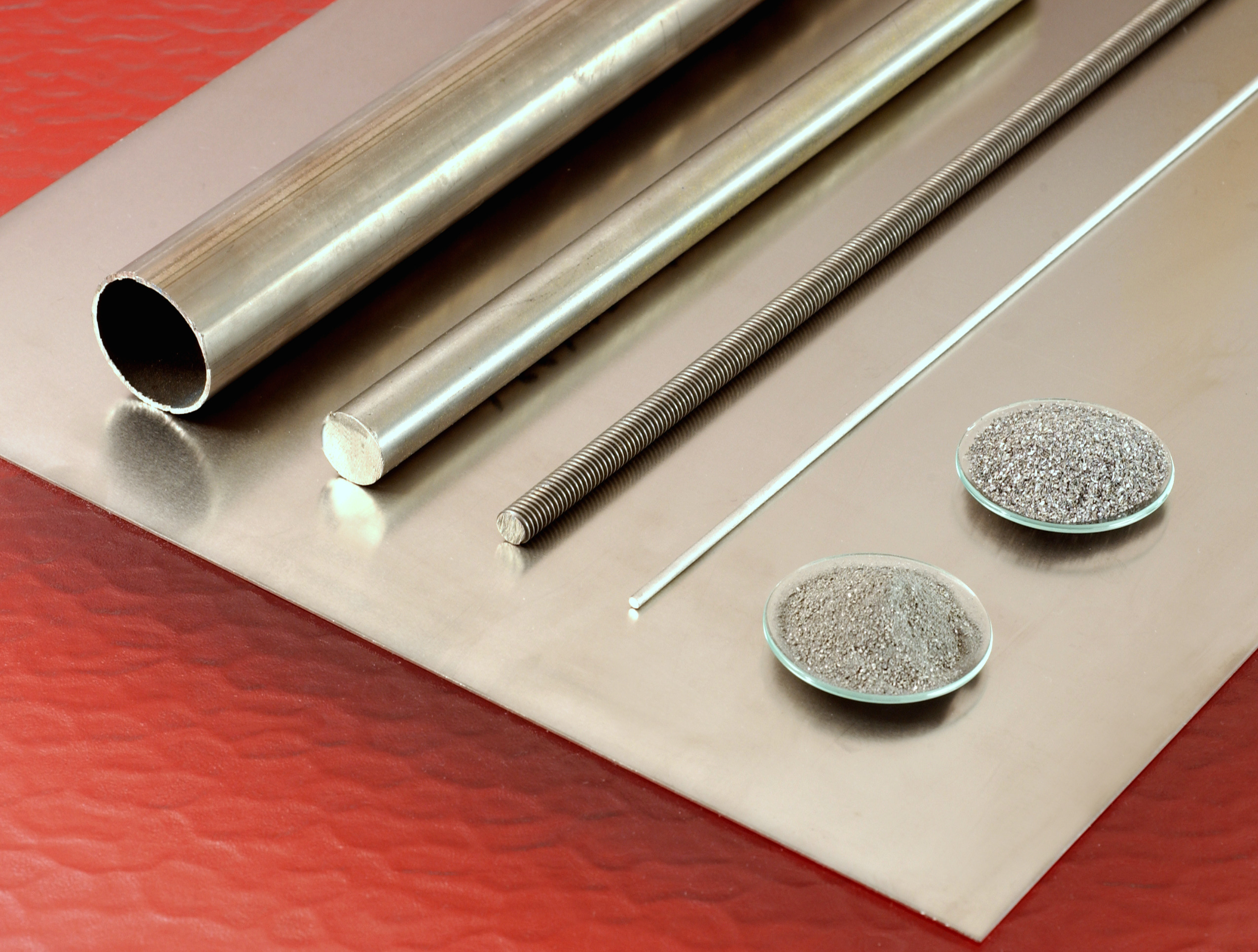
Basic titanium products: plate, tube, rods, and powder

Common titanium alloys are made by reduction. For example, cuprotitanium (rutile with copper added), ferrocarbon titanium (ilmenite reduced with coke in an electric furnace), and manganotitanium (rutile with manganese or manganese oxides) are reduced.

About fifty grades of titanium alloys are designed and currently used, although only a couple of dozen are readily available commercially. The ASTM International recognizes 31 grades of titanium metal and alloys, of which grades one through four are commercially pure (unalloyed). Those four vary in tensile strength as a function of oxygen content, with grade 1 being the most ductile (lowest tensile strength with an oxygen content of 0.18%), and grade 4 the least ductile (highest tensile strength with an oxygen content of 0.40%). The remaining grades are alloys, each designed for specific properties of ductility, strength, hardness, electrical resistivity, creep resistance, specific corrosion resistance, and combinations thereof.

In addition to the ASTM specifications, titanium alloys are also produced to meet aerospace and military specifications (SAE-AMS, MIL-T), ISO standards, and country-specific specifications, as well as proprietary end-user specifications for aerospace, military, medical, and industrial applications.

==== Forming and forging ====
Commercially pure flat product (sheet, plate) can be formed readily, but processing must take into account of the tendency of the metal to springback. This is especially true of certain high-strength alloys. Exposure to the oxygen in air at the elevated temperatures used in forging results in formation of a brittle oxygen-rich metallic surface layer called "alpha case" that worsens the fatigue properties, so it must be removed by milling, etching, or electrochemical treatment. The working of titanium may include friction welding, cryoforging, and vacuum arc remelting.

== Applications ==
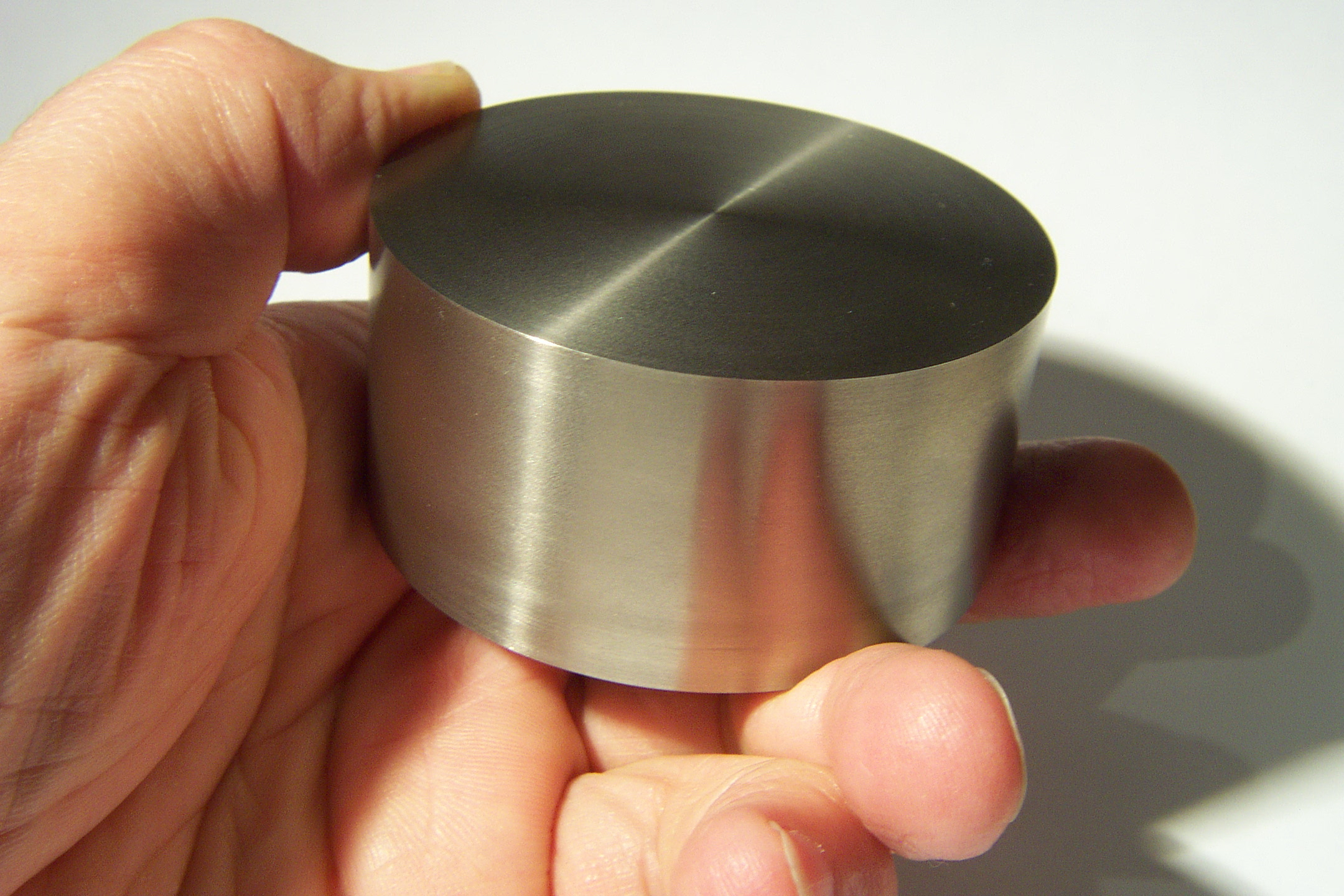
A titanium cylinder

Titanium is used in steel as an alloying element (ferro-titanium) to reduce grain size and as a deoxidizer, and in stainless steel to reduce carbon content. Titanium is often alloyed with aluminium (to refine grain size), vanadium, copper (to harden), iron, manganese, molybdenum, and other metals. Titanium mill products (sheet, plate, bar, wire, forgings, castings) find application in industrial, aerospace, recreational, and emerging markets. Powdered titanium is used in pyrotechnics as a source of bright-burning particles.

=== Pigments, additives, and coatings ===
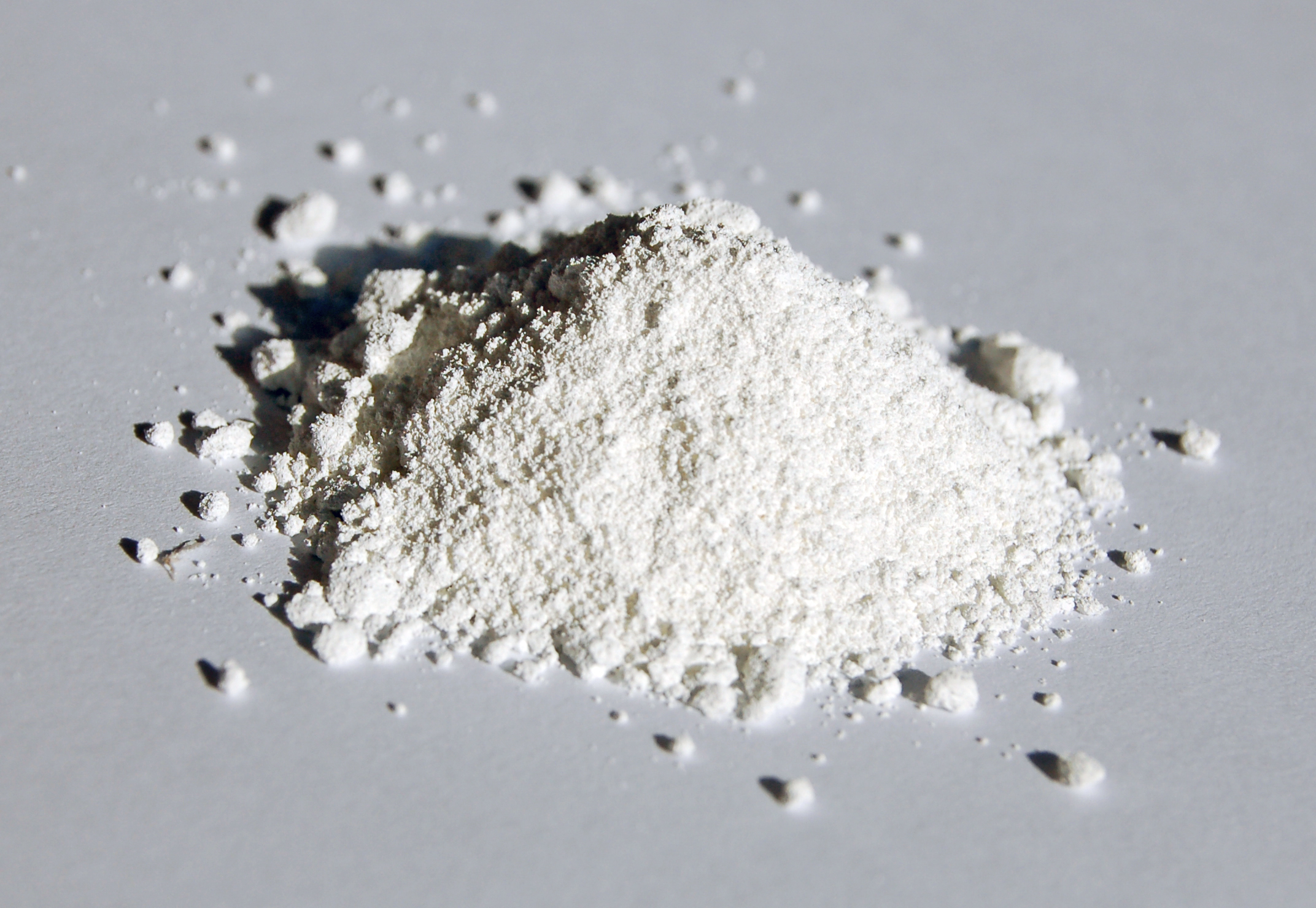
Titanium dioxide is the most commonly used compound of titanium.

Titanium dioxide (TiO_{2}) is the most common compound of the element, being the end point of 95% of the world's refined titanium. It is a widely used white pigment. It is also used in cement, in gemstones, and as an optical opacifier in paper.

TiO_{2} pigment is chemically inert, resists fading in sunlight, and is very opaque: it imparts a pure and brilliant white color to the brown or grey chemicals that form the majority of household plastics. In nature, this compound is found in the minerals anatase, brookite, and rutile. Paint made with titanium dioxide does well in severe temperatures and marine environments. Pure titanium dioxide has a very high index of refraction and an optical dispersion higher than diamond. Titanium dioxide is used in sunscreens because it reflects and absorbs UV light.

=== Aerospace and marine ===
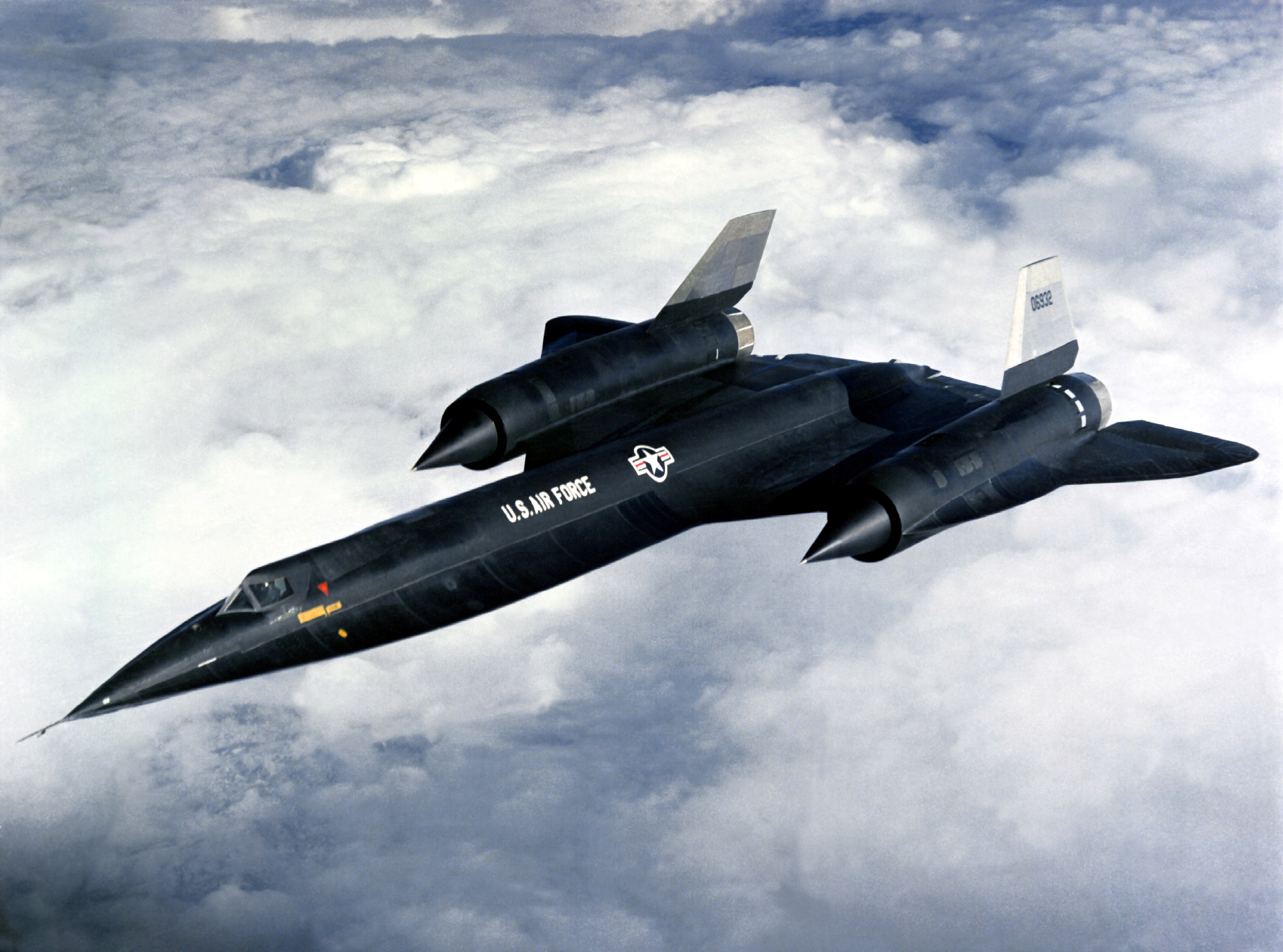
The Lockheed A-12, one of the first planes with a frame mostly made of titanium

Because titanium alloys have high tensile strength to density ratio, high corrosion resistance, fatigue resistance, high crack resistance, and ability to withstand moderately high temperatures without creeping, they are used in aircraft, armor plating, naval ships, spacecraft, and missiles. For these applications, titanium is alloyed with aluminium, zirconium, nickel, vanadium, and other elements to manufacture a variety of components including critical structural parts, landing gear, firewalls, exhaust ducts (helicopters), and hydraulic systems. About two thirds of all titanium metal produced is used in aircraft frames and engines. The titanium 6AL-4V alloy accounts for almost 50% of all alloys used in aircraft applications.

The Lockheed A-12 and the SR-71 "Blackbird" were two of the first aircraft frames where titanium was used, paving the way for much wider use in modern military and commercial aircraft. A large amount of titanium mill products are used in the production of many aircraft, such as (following values are amount of raw mill products used, only a fraction of this ends up in the finished aircraft): 116 metric tons are used in the Boeing 787, 77 in the Airbus A380, 59 in the Boeing 777, 45 in the Boeing 747, 32 in the Airbus A340, 18 in the Boeing 737, 18 in the Airbus A330, and 12 in the Airbus A320. In aero engine applications, titanium is used for rotors, compressor blades, hydraulic system components, and nacelles. An early use in jet engines was for the Orenda Iroquois in the 1950s.

Because titanium is resistant to corrosion by sea water, it is used to make propeller shafts, rigging, heat exchangers in desalination plants, heater-chillers for salt water aquariums, fishing line and leader, and divers' knives. Titanium is used in the housings and components of ocean-deployed surveillance and monitoring devices for science and military. The former Soviet Union developed techniques for making submarines with hulls of titanium alloys, forging titanium in huge vacuum tubes.

=== Industrial ===
Welded titanium pipe and process equipment (heat exchangers, tanks, process vessels, valves) are used in the chemical and petrochemical industries primarily for corrosion resistance. Specific alloys are used in oil and gas downhole applications and nickel hydrometallurgy for their high strength (e. g.: titanium beta C alloy), corrosion resistance, or both. The pulp and paper industry uses titanium in process equipment exposed to corrosive media, such as sodium hypochlorite or wet chlorine gas (in the bleachery). Titanium is also used in sputtering targets.

Powdered titanium acts as a non-evaporative getter, and is one of several gas-reactive materials used to remove gases from ultra-high vacuum systems. This application manifested in titanium sublimation pumps first employed in 1961, though the metal was first used in vacuum systems to prevent chambers from oxidizing in a design created by Raymond Herb in 1953.

Titanium tetrachloride (TiCl_{4}), a colorless liquid, is important as an intermediate in the process of making TiO_{2} and is also used to produce the Ziegler–Natta catalyst. Titanium tetrachloride is also used to iridize glass and, because it fumes strongly in moist air, it is used to make smoke screens. In many industrial applications, titanium and its alloys can serve as a potential substitute for other metals, such as nickel, niobium, scandium, silver, tantalum, and tungsten.

=== Consumer and architectural ===
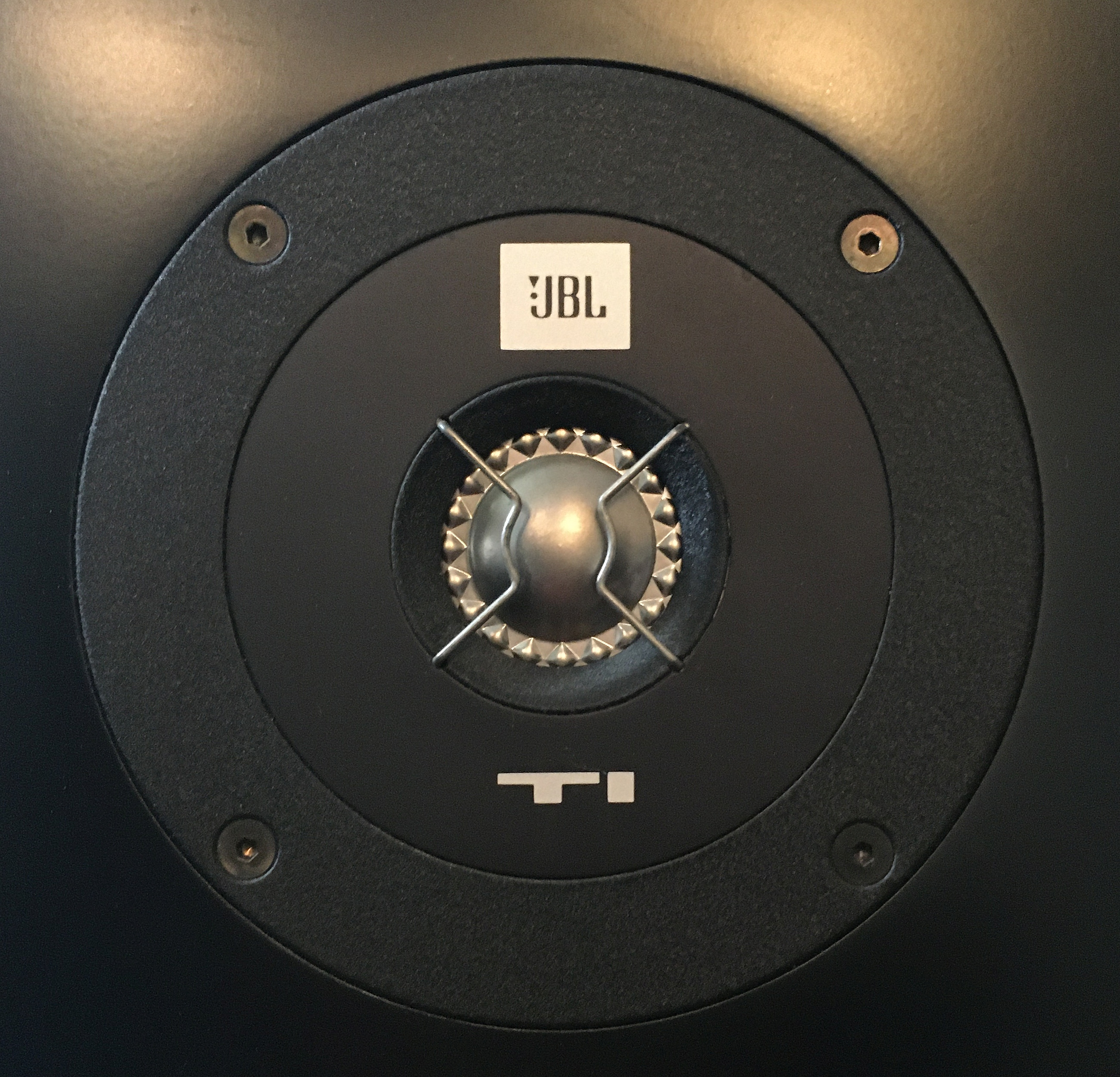
Tweeter loudspeaker driver with a membrane with 25 mm diameter made from titanium; from a JBL TI 5000 loudspeaker box, c. 1997

Titanium metal is used in automotive applications, particularly in automobile and motorcycle racing where low weight and high strength and rigidity are critical. The metal is generally too expensive for the general consumer market, though some late model Corvettes have been manufactured with titanium exhausts.

Titanium is used in many sporting goods: tennis rackets, golf clubs, lacrosse stick shafts; cricket, hockey, lacrosse, and football helmet grills, and some bicycle frames and components. Titanium is used in spectacle frames, as it is durable and protect the lenses, though it may be less flexible than alternatives. Its biocompatibility is a potential benefit over other glasses frame materials. Titanium is a common material for backpacking cookware and eating utensils. Titanium horseshoes are preferred to steel by farriers because they are lighter and more durable. Some upmarket lightweight and corrosion-resistant tools, such as shovels, knife handles and flashlights, are made of titanium or titanium alloys.

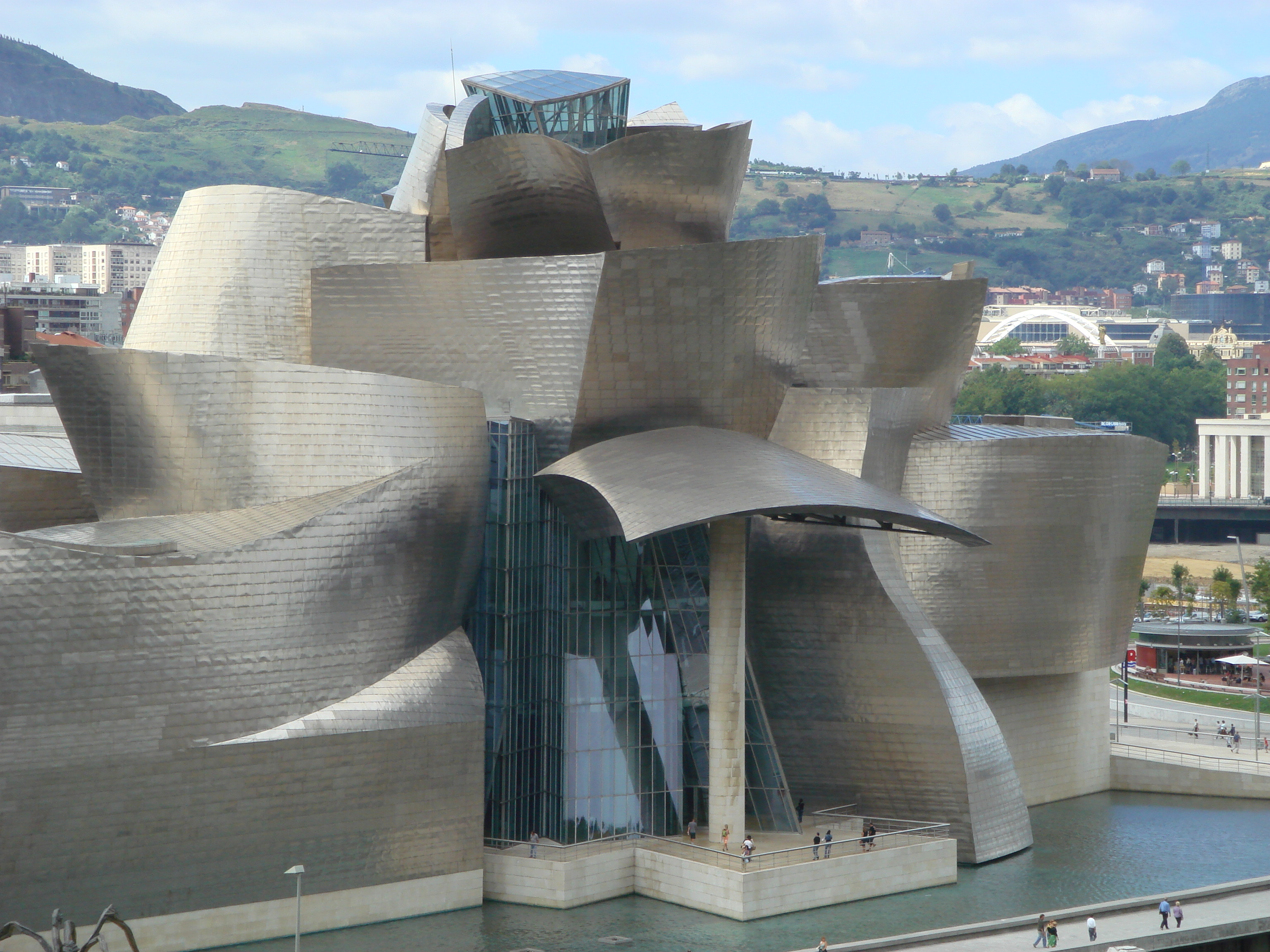
Titanium cladding of Frank Gehry's Guggenheim Museum, Bilbao

Titanium has occasionally been used in architecture. The 42.5 m (139 ft) Monument to Yuri Gagarin, the first man to travel in space, as well as the upper part of the 110 m (360 ft) Monument to the Conquerors of Space on top of the Cosmonaut Museum in Moscow are made of titanium. The Guggenheim Museum Bilbao and the Cerritos Millennium Library were the first buildings in Europe and North America, respectively, to be sheathed in titanium panels. Titanium sheathing was used in the Frederic C. Hamilton Building in Denver, Colorado.

Because of titanium's superior strength and light weight relative to other metals (steel, stainless steel, and aluminium), and because of advances in metalworking techniques, its use has become widespread in the manufacture of firearms. Primary uses include pistol frames and revolver cylinders. For the same reasons, it is used in the body of some laptop computers (for example, in Apple's PowerBook G4) and phones (such as the iPhone 15 Pro).

=== Jewelry ===
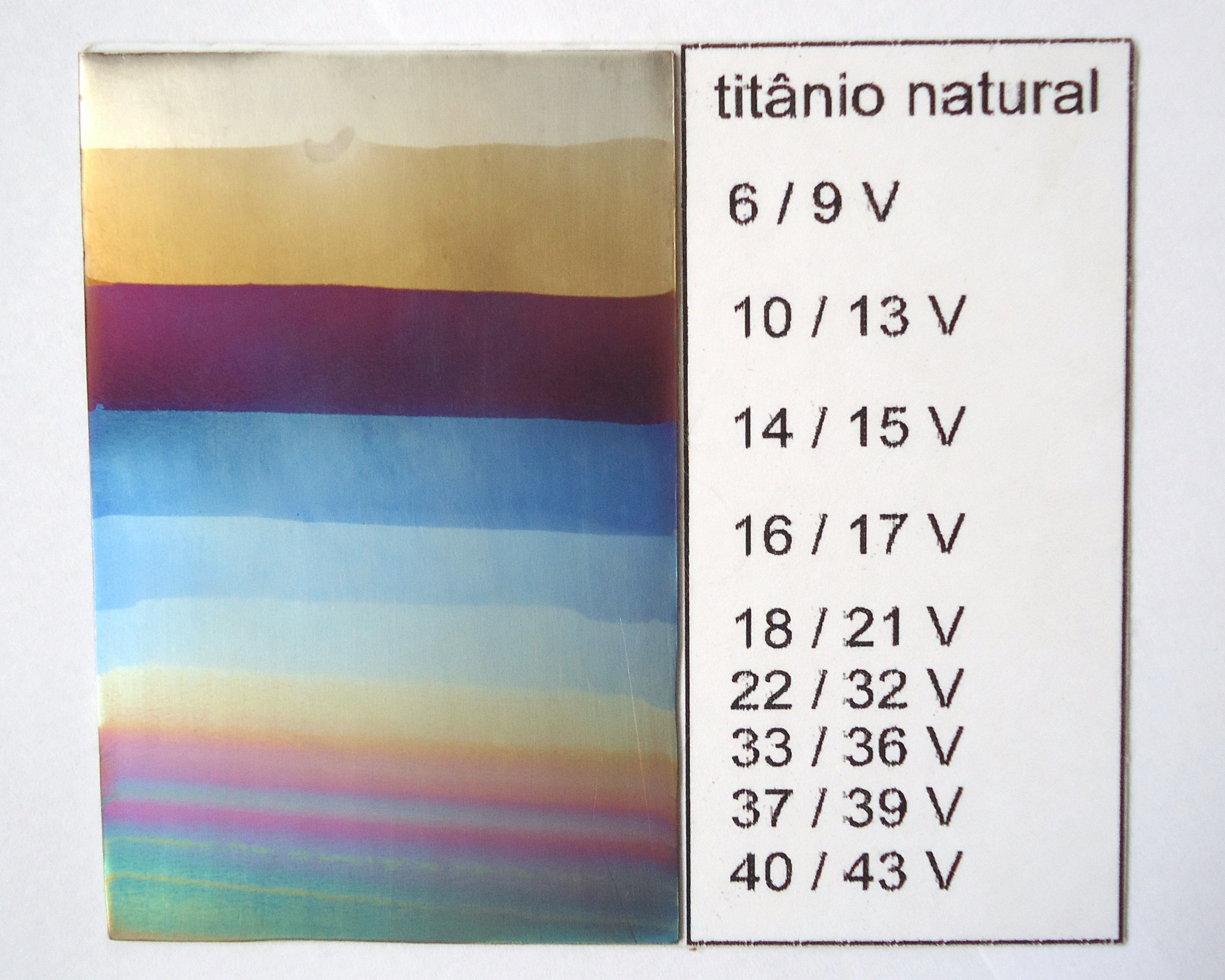
Relation between voltage and color for anodized titanium

Because of its durability, titanium is used in some designer jewelry, such as titanium rings. Its inertness makes it hypoallergenic and wearable in environments such as swimming pools. Titanium is also alloyed with gold to produce an alloy that can be marketed as 24-karat gold, because the 1% of alloyed Ti is insufficient to require a lesser mark. The resulting alloy is roughly the hardness of 14-karat gold and is more durable than pure 24-karat gold.

Titanium's durability, light weight, and dent and corrosion resistance make it useful for watch cases. Some artists work with titanium to produce sculptures, decorative objects and furniture. Titanium may be anodized to vary the thickness of the surface oxide layer, causing optical interference fringes and a variety of bright colors. With its variable coloration and chemical inertness, titanium is a popular metal for body piercing.

Titanium has a minor use in dedicated non-circulating coins and medals. In 1999, the world's first titanium coin was minted for Gibraltar's millennium celebration. Pobjoy Mint, the British mint that produced the coin, continued to manufacture anodized titanium coins until its closure in 2023. The Gold Coast Titans, an Australian rugby league team, award a medal of pure titanium to their player of the year.

=== Medical ===
Because titanium is biocompatible (non-toxic and not rejected by the body), it has many medical uses, including surgical implements and implants, such as hip balls and sockets (joint replacement) and dental implants. Titanium and titanium alloy implants have been used in surgery since the 1950s, and are favored due to their low rate of corrosion, long life, and low Young's modulus. A titanium alloy that contains 6% aluminium and 4% vanadium commonly used in the aerospace industry is also a common material for artificial joints.

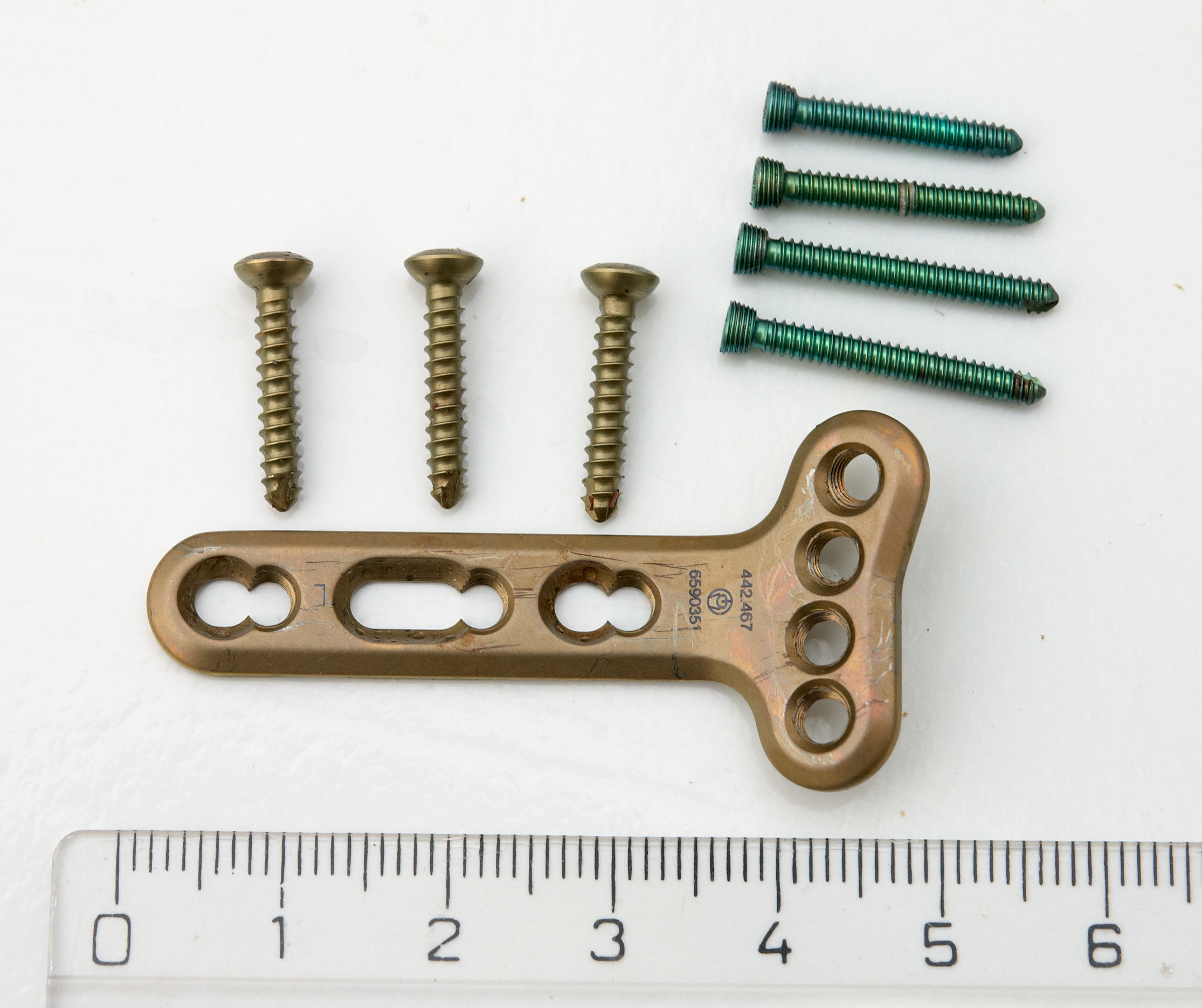
Medical screws and plate used to repair wrist fractures. Scale is in centimeters.

Titanium has the inherent ability to osseointegrate, enabling use in dental implants that can last for over 30 years. This property is also useful for orthopedic implant applications. These benefit from titanium's lower modulus of elasticity to more closely match that of the bone that such devices are intended to repair. As a result, skeletal loads are more evenly shared between bone and implant, leading to a lower incidence of bone degradation due to stress shielding and periprosthetic bone fractures, which occur at the boundaries of orthopedic implants. However, titanium alloys' stiffness is still more than twice that of bone, so adjacent bone bears a greatly reduced load and may deteriorate. Biomedical implants coated with a combination of silver and titanium have been researched as a potential option for load-bearing implants that need antimicrobial surfaces.

Modern advancements in additive manufacturing techniques have increased potential for titanium use in orthopedic implant applications. Complex implant scaffold designs can be 3D-printed using titanium alloys, which allows for more patient-specific applications and increased implant osseointegration. Because titanium is non-ferromagnetic, patients with titanium implants can be safely examined with magnetic resonance imaging (convenient for long-term implants). Preparing titanium for implantation in the body involves subjecting it to a high-temperature plasma arc which removes the surface atoms, exposing fresh titanium that is instantly oxidized. Titanium is used for the surgical instruments used in image-guided surgery, as well as wheelchairs, crutches, and any other products where high strength and low weight are desirable.

Titanium dioxide nanoparticles are widely used in electronics and the delivery of pharmaceuticals and cosmetics.

==== Anticancer therapy studies ====
Following the success of platinum-based chemotherapy, titanium(IV) complexes were among the first non-platinum compounds to be tested and accepted for clinical trials in cancer treatment. The advantage of titanium compounds lies in their high efficacy and low toxicity in vivo. In biological environments, hydrolysis leads to the safe and inert titanium dioxide. Despite these advantages, the first candidate compounds failed clinical trials due to insufficient efficacy to toxicity ratios and formulation complications. Further development resulted in the creation of potentially effective, selective, and stable titanium-based drugs.

=== Nuclear waste storage ===
Because of its corrosion resistance, containers made of titanium have been studied for the long-term storage of nuclear waste. Containers lasting more than 100,000 years are thought possible with manufacturing conditions that minimize material defects. A titanium "drip shield" has been considered for installation over containers of other types to enhance their longevity.

== Hazards and safety ==
Titanium (powder)
Hazards
- GHS labelling
Pictograms	(GHS02: Flammable)
Signal word	Danger
Hazard statements	H228
Precautionary statements	P210, P240, P241, P280, P370+P378
NFPA 704 (fire diamond)	0 4 1

Titanium is non-toxic, even in large doses, and does not play any natural role inside the human body. An estimated 0.8 milligrams of titanium is ingested by humans each day, but most passes through the digestive system without being absorbed in the tissues. However, it can sometimes bioaccumulate in tissues that contain silica. Yellow nail syndrome has been reported in individuals that have been exposed to titanium, though the disorder's rarity have made it difficult to determine a direct association between exposure and disorder development.

As a powder or in the form of metal shavings, titanium metal poses a significant fire hazard and, when heated in air, an explosion hazard. Water and carbon dioxide are ineffective for extinguishing a titanium fire; Class D dry powder agents must be used instead. When used in the production or handling of chlorine, titanium exposed to dry chlorine gas may result in a titanium–chlorine fire. Titanium can also catch fire when a fresh, non-oxidized surface comes in contact with liquid oxygen.

== Function in plants ==
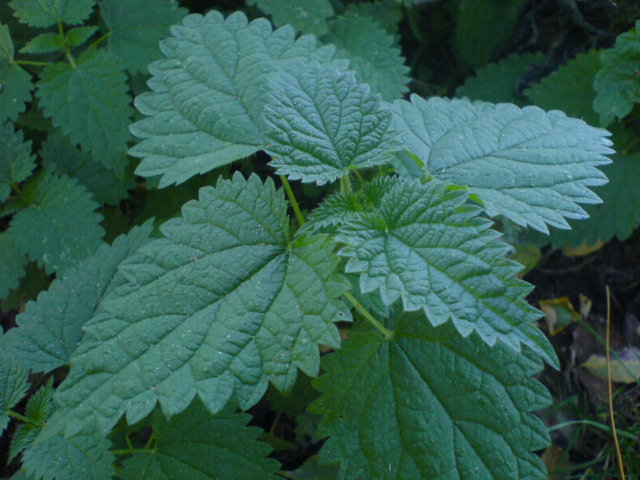
Nettles contain up to 80 parts per million of titanium.

An unknown mechanism in plants may use titanium to stimulate the production of carbohydrates and encourage growth. This may explain why most plants contain about 1 part per million (ppm) of titanium, food plants have about 2 ppm, and horsetail and nettle contain up to 80 ppm.

== See also ==
- Titanium alloys
- Suboxide
- Titanium in zircon geothermometry
- Titanium Man

== Bibliography ==
- Barksdale, Jelks (1968). "Titanium". In Clifford A. Hampel (ed.). The Encyclopedia of the Chemical Elements. New York, NY: Reinhold Book Corporation. pp. 732–738. LCCN 68029938.
- Donachie, Matthew J. Jr. (1988). Titanium: A technical guide. Metals Park, OH: ASM International. p. 11. ISBN 978-0-87170-309-5.
- Emsley, John (2001). "Titanium". Nature's Building Blocks: An A-Z guide to the elements. Oxford, England, UK: Oxford University Press. ISBN 978-0-19-850340-8.
- Greenwood, N. N.; Earnshaw, A. (1997). Chemistry of the Elements (2nd ed.). Oxford: Butterworth-Heinemann. ISBN 978-0-7506-3365-9.
- Roza, Greg (2008). Titanium (1st ed.). New York, NY: The Rosen Publishing Group. ISBN 978-1-4042-1412-5.
