= John Inglis (cricketer) =

English cricketer (born 1979)

John William Inglis (born 19 October 1979 (age 46))) is an English first-class cricketer, who played one match for Yorkshire County Cricket Club in 2000. A right-handed batsman, he batted at number three and scored 2 runs in both innings against the West Indians at Headingley, a match Yorkshire lost by ten wickets.

Inglis was born in Ripon, Yorkshire. He played in two Under-19 ODIs for England Under-19s against Australia U 19s in 1999, in the Minor Counties Trophy for Yorkshire Cricket Board (1998), in the Second Eleven Championship for Yorkshire Second XI (1998–2000) and for Durham Second XI (2001), the Yorkshire Academy (1996–1997) and Harrogate C.C. (2005).

Inglis is now semi retired from cricket, he appears occasionally for Beckwithshaw C.C, based on the outskirts of Harrogate, Yorkshire, whilst running a successful Building firm which he founded with his late father Bill.
