= Industrial Extraction =

Industrial Extraction is the process by which harmful air contaminants are removed from the work place for the protection of employees and the environment.

In the UK, the Health and Safety Executive has implemented COSHH regulations to ensure all industrial workplaces protect the health of their employees via effective Local Exhaust Ventilation (LEV). This policy is now being mirrored in other parts of the world including China and North America.

Harmful air contaminants can be particles, gases or vapours and/or combinations or all three. ‘Particles’ include dusts, fumes, mists and fibres.

== Extraction systems ==
Extraction systems to remove airborne particles from industrial workplaces have been in use for a number of years.

=== Centrifugal systems ===
Centrifugal systems are used in a wide range of manufacturing applications in industries including aerospace, automotive, medical, defence and food production. These systems use a perforated drum with specially designed vanes which rotate at very high speeds. Oil mist is drawn into the unit and impacts on the vanes at high velocity and specially designed synthetic pads assist the collection process and filter out stray solid particles.

The centrifugal force then pushes the oil to the unit’s outer case where it drains back to the machine for re-use or collection and clean air is returned to the workshop through the top of the unit. The dangerous particles have been removed and employees are protected from the potential health hazards associated with breathing in polluted air.
