= John Bellingham Inglis =

John Bellingham Inglis (14 February 1780 – 9 December 1870) was an English book collector and amateur scholar. He translated Richard de Bury's Philobiblon.
