= John Inglis (American football) =

American football coach (1887–1918)

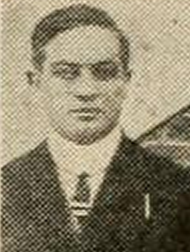
- c. 1912

Biographical details
- Born: September 4, 1887; Troy, New York, U.S.
- Died: October 6, 1918 (aged 31); Troy, New York, U.S.
- Education: Rensselaer Polytechnic Institute (1910)

Coaching career (HC unless noted)

Football
- 1911–1913: RPI

Basketball
- 1910–1912: RPI

Head coaching record
- Overall: 15–9–4

John W. Inglis (September 4, 1887 – October 6, 1918) was the head football coach for the Rensselaer Polytechnic Institute Engineers football team from 1911 to 1913. He compiled a record of 15–9–4.

== Head coaching record ==
Year	Team	Overall	Conference	Standing	Bowl/playoffs
RPI Engineers (Independent) (1911–1913)
1911	RPI	7–1–2			
1912	RPI	5–4–1			
1913	RPI	3–4–1			
RPI:		15–9–4			
Total:		15–9–4			
