= Alberger process =

Industrial method of producing salt from rock salt

The Alberger process is an industrial method of producing salt from rock salt.

== Method ==
The Alberger process begins by heating brine under high pressure with a series of heaters. Impurities are removed using a tank filled with granite cubes called a graveler. When the pressure is released, salt crystals form in a steam-heated evaporation pan. This results in pyramid-shaped flake salt, which has low bulk density, high solubility, and good adhesion. According to a scientific article from 1946, the process results in salt of high purity but "is the least economical method for the production of a given quantity of salt."

== Production ==
Cargill operates a plant in St. Clair, Michigan that is the only place in the United States that manufactures such salt using the Alberger process. Diamond Crystal Kosher Salt is a brand of salt produced using the Alberger process. Because of its shape, density and flavor characteristics, it is often a preferred choice by snack food manufacturers.

== History ==
The method was patented by Charles L. Weil on June 8, 1915.
