= Hunter process =

Industrial process producing titanium

The Hunter process was the first industrial process to produce pure metallic titanium. It was invented in 1910 by Matthew A. Hunter, a chemist born in New Zealand who worked in the United States. The process involves reducing titanium tetrachloride (TiCl_{4}) with sodium (Na) in a batch reactor with an inert atmosphere at a temperature of 1,000 °C. Diluted hydrochloric acid is then used to leach the salt from the product.

TiCl_{4}(g) + 4 Na(l) → 4 NaCl(l) + Ti(s)

Prior to the Hunter process, all efforts to produce Ti metal afforded highly impure material, often titanium nitride (which resembles a metal). The Hunter process was used until 1993, when it was replaced by the more economical Kroll process, which was developed in the 1940s. In the Kroll process, TiCl_{4} is reduced by magnesium instead of sodium. Both methods share the same initial step, obtaining TiCl_{4} from ore by chlorination and carbothermic reduction of the oxygen. The Kroll process is now the most commonly used titanium smelting process.

The Hunter process was conducted in either one or two steps. If a single step was used the reaction equation is as above. Because of the large amount of heat generated by the reduction using sodium compared to using magnesium, and the difficulty in controlling the vapor pressure of liquid sodium, a two step process may instead be used. The two step processes consisted of reducing TiCl_{4} to TiCl_{2} with half the stoichiometric amount of sodium required to reduce TiCl_{4} to Ti. Next, the TiCl_{2} in molten sodium chloride is transferred to a different container with the additional sodium required to form Ti. The two step processes proceeded according to the following two reactions:

TiCl_{4}(g) + 2Na(l) → TiCl_{2}(l, in NaCl) + 2NaCl(l)
TiCl_{2}(l, in NaCl) + 2Na(l) → Ti(s) + 2NaCl(l)

The titanium produced by the Hunter process is less contaminated by iron and other elements and adheres to the reduction container walls less than in the Kroll process. The titanium produced by the Hunter process is in the form of powder called sponge fines. This form is useful as a raw material in powder metallurgy.

The main limiting factor for the usefulness of the Hunter process is the difficulty of separating the produced NaCl from the titanium. The vapor pressure of NaCl produced in the Hunter process is lower than the vapor pressure of MgCl_{2} produced by the Kroll process. Thus it is difficult to separate the NaCl from the titanium using distillation in an efficient manner. Therefore, the NaCl is removed by leaching in an aqueous solution. Recovering the byproduct (NaCl) from this aqueous solution is a process that requires additional energy. These issues motivated the discontinuation of the Hunter process in industry in 1993. Research into sodium reduction continues to this day due to the superior form and purity of the metal deposit produced when compared with the Kroll process.
