= Yttria-stabilized zirconia =

Ceramic with room temperature stable cubic crystal structure

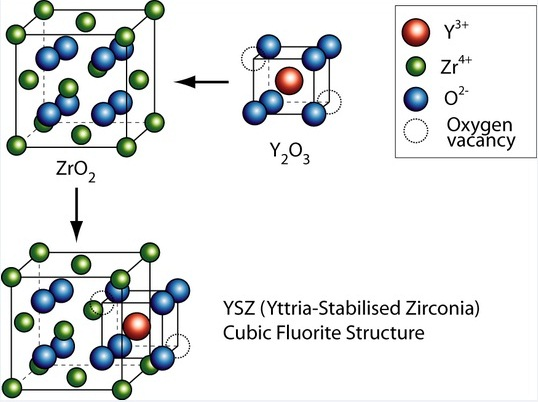
Yttria-stabilized zirconia (YSZ) crystal structure

Yttria-stabilized zirconia (YSZ) is a ceramic in which the cubic crystal structure of zirconium dioxide is made stable at room temperature by an addition of yttrium oxide. These oxides are commonly called "zirconia" (ZrO_{2}) and "yttria" (Y_{2}O_{3}), hence the name.

== Stabilization ==
Pure zirconium dioxide undergoes a phase transformation from monoclinic (stable at room temperature) to tetragonal (at about 1173 °C) and then to cubic (at about 2370 °C), according to the scheme

monoclinic (1173 °C) ↔ tetragonal (2370 °C) ↔ cubic (2690 °C) ↔ melt.

During these transformations, zirconia can experience volume expansion of up to 5-6%. This change can induce internal stresses, leading to cracking or fracture in ceramic materials.

Obtaining stable sintered zirconia ceramic products is difficult because of the large volume change, about 5%, accompanying the transition from tetragonal to monoclinic. Stabilization of the cubic polymorph of zirconia over wider range of temperatures is accomplished by substitution of some of the Zr^{4+} ions (ionic radius of 0.82 Å, too small for ideal lattice of fluorite characteristic for the cubic zirconia) in the crystal lattice with slightly larger ions, e.g., those of Y^{3+} (ionic radius of 0.96 Å). The resulting doped zirconia materials are termed stabilized zirconias.

Materials related to YSZ include calcia-, magnesia-, ceria- or alumina-stabilized zirconias, or partially stabilized zirconias (PSZ). Hafnia-stabilized zirconia has about 25% lower thermal conductivity, making it more suitable for thermal barrier applications.

Although 8–9 mol% YSZ is known to not be completely stabilized in the pure cubic YSZ phase up to temperatures above 1000 °C.

Commonly used abbreviations in conjunction with yttria-stabilized zirconia are:

- Partly stabilized zirconia ZrO_{2}:
  - PSZ – partially stabilized zirconia
  - TZP – tetragonal zirconia polycrystal
  - 4YSZ: with 4 mol% Y_{2}O_{3} partially stabilized ZrO_{2}, yttria-stabilized zirconia
- Fully stabilized zirconias ZrO_{2}:
  - FSZ – fully stabilized zirconia
  - CSZ – cubic stabilized zirconia
  - 8YSZ – with 8 mol% Y_{2}O_{3} fully stabilized ZrO_{2}
  - 8YDZ – 8–9 mol% Y_{2}O_{3}-doped ZrO_{2}: the material is not completely stabilized and decomposes at high application temperatures, see next paragraphs)

== Thermal expansion coefficient ==
The thermal expansion coefficients depends on the modification of zirconia as follows:

- Monoclinic: 7x10^{−6}/K
- Tetragonal: 12x10^{−6}/K
- Y_{2}O_{3} stabilized: 10.5x10^{−6}/K

== Ionic conductivity and degradation ==
By the addition of yttria to pure zirconia (e.g., fully stabilized YSZ) Y^{3+} ions replace Zr^{4+} on the cationic sublattice. Thereby, oxygen vacancies are generated due to charge neutrality:

$$\text{Y}_2\text{O}_3 \to 2\text{Y}_\text{Zr}' + 3\text{O}_\text{O}^\text{x} + \text{V}_\text{O}^{\bullet\bullet}
\text{ with } [\text{V}_\text{O}^{\bullet\bullet}] = \frac{1}{2}[\text{Y}_\text{Zr}'],$$

meaning that two Y^{3+} ions generate one vacancy on the anionic sublattice. This facilitates moderate conductivity of yttrium-stabilized zirconia for O^{2−} ions (and thus electrical conductivity) at elevated and high temperature. This ability to conduct O^{2−} ions makes yttria-stabilized zirconia well suited for application as solid electrolyte in solid oxide fuel cells.

For low dopant concentrations, the ionic conductivity of the stabilized zirconias increases with increasing Y_{2}O_{3} content. It has a maximum around 8–9 mol% almost independent of the temperature (800–1200 °C). Unfortunately, 8–9 mol% YSZ (8YSZ, 8YDZ) also turned out to be situated in the 2-phase field (c+t) of the YSZ phase diagram at these temperatures, which causes the material's decomposition into Y-enriched and depleted regions on the nanometre scale and, consequently, the electrical degradation during operation. The microstructural and chemical changes on the nanometre scale are accompanied by the drastic decrease of the oxygen-ion conductivity of 8YSZ (degradation of 8YSZ) of about 40% at 950 °C within 2500 hours. Traces of impurities like Ni, dissolved in the 8YSZ, e.g., due to fuel-cell fabrication, can have a severe impact on the decomposition rate (acceleration of inherent decomposition of the 8YSZ by orders of magnitude) such that the degradation of conductivity even becomes problematic at low operation temperatures in the range of 500–700 °C.

Nowadays, more complex ceramics like co-doped zirconia (e.g., with scandia) are in use as solid electrolytes.

== Applications ==
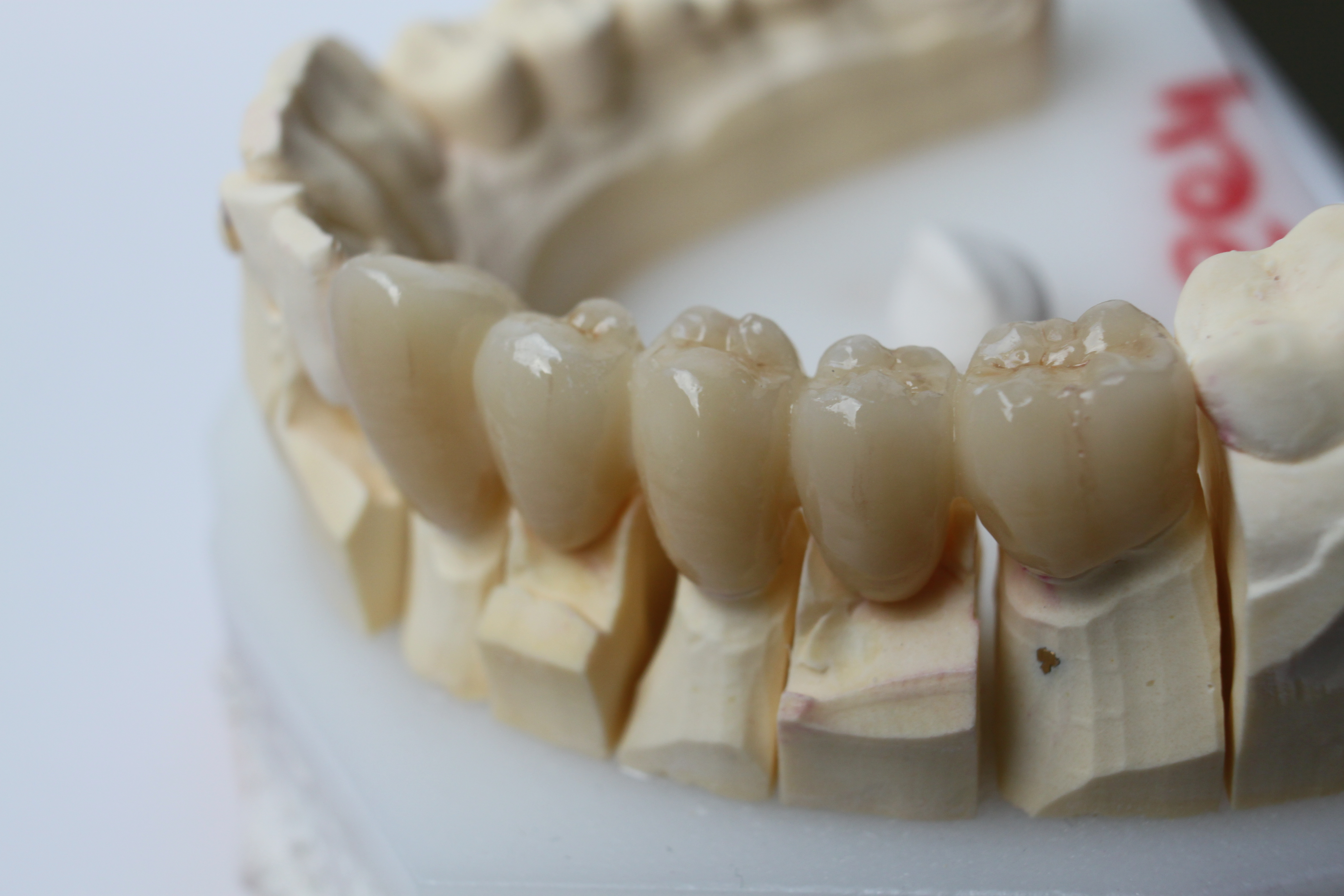
Multiple metal-free dental crowns

YSZ has a number of applications:

- For its hardness and chemical inertness (e.g., tooth crowns).
- As a refractory (e.g., in jet engines).
- As a thermal barrier coating in gas turbines.
- As an electroceramic due to its ion-conducting properties (e.g., to determine oxygen content in exhaust gases, to measure pH in high-temperature water, in fuel cells).
- Used in the production of a solid oxide fuel cell (SOFC). YSZ is used as the solid electrolyte, which enables oxygen ion conduction while blocking electronic conduction. In order to achieve sufficient ion conduction, an SOFC with a YSZ electrolyte must be operated at high temperatures (800–1000 °C). While it is advantageous that YSZ retains mechanical robustness at those temperatures, the high temperature necessary is often a disadvantage of SOFCs. The high density of YSZ is also necessary in order to physically separate the gaseous fuel from oxygen, or else the electrochemical system would produce no electrical power.
- For its hardness and optical properties in monocrystal form (see "cubic zirconia"), it is used as jewelry.
- As a material for non-metallic knife blades, produced by Boker and Kyocera companies.
- In water-based pastes for do-it-yourself ceramics and cements. These contain microscopic YSZ milled fibers or sub-micrometer particles, often with potassium silicate and zirconium acetate binders (at mildly acidic pH). The cementation occurs on removal of water. The resulting ceramic material is suitable for very high-temperature applications.
- YSZ doped with rare-earth materials can act as a thermographic phosphor and a luminescent material.
- Historically used for glowing rods in Nernst lamps.
- As a high-temperature coating, produced by ZYP Coatings, Inc.
- As a high-precision alignment sleeve for optical fiber connector ferrules.
- YSZ is a common buffer layer for the epitaxial growth of metals and oxides on silicon.

== See also ==
- Cubic zirconia – Cubic crystalline form of zirconium dioxide
- Sintering – Process of forming and bonding material by heat or pressure
- Superconducting wire – Wires exhibiting zero resistance
