= Hart, Michigan =

- City
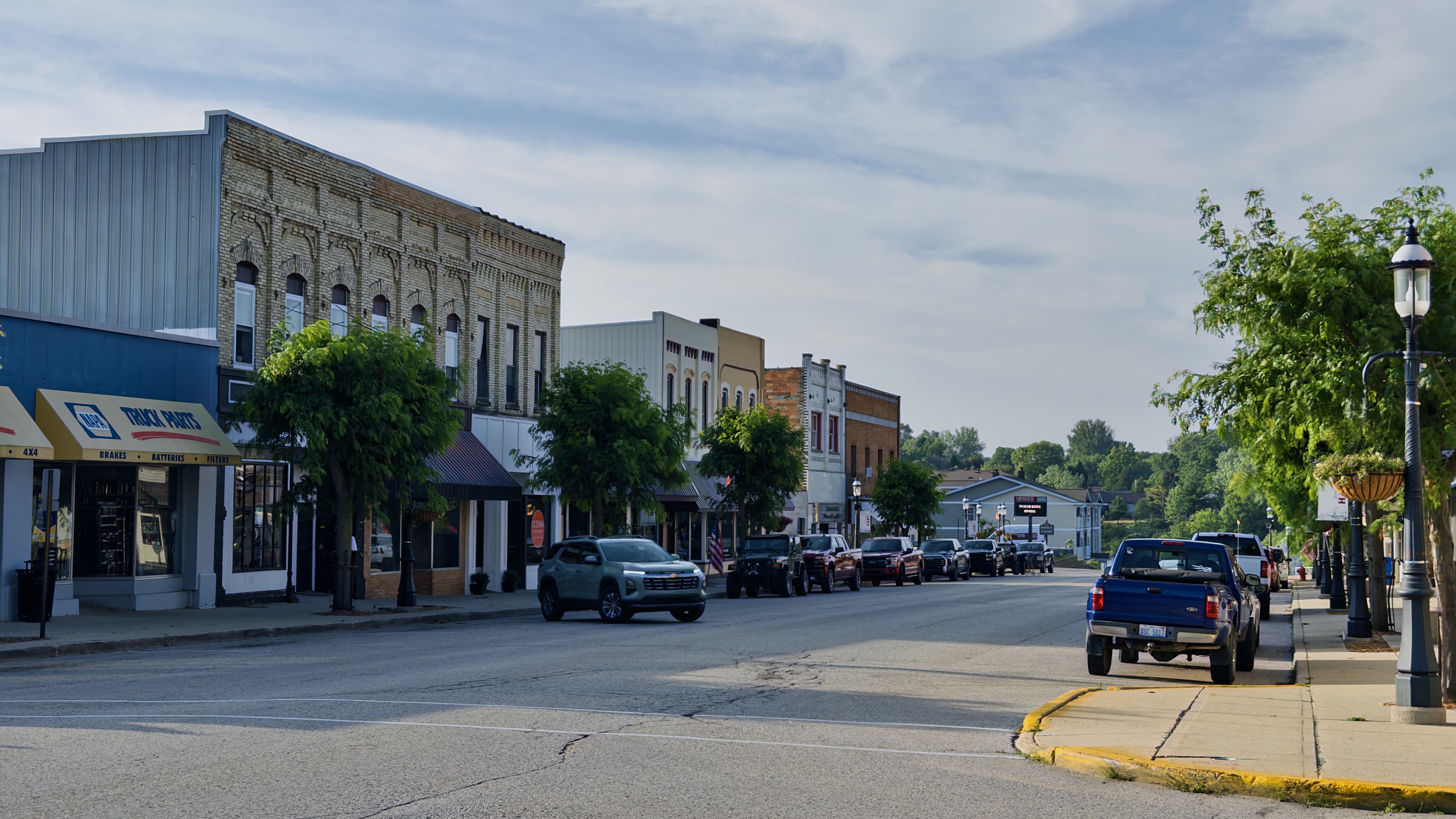
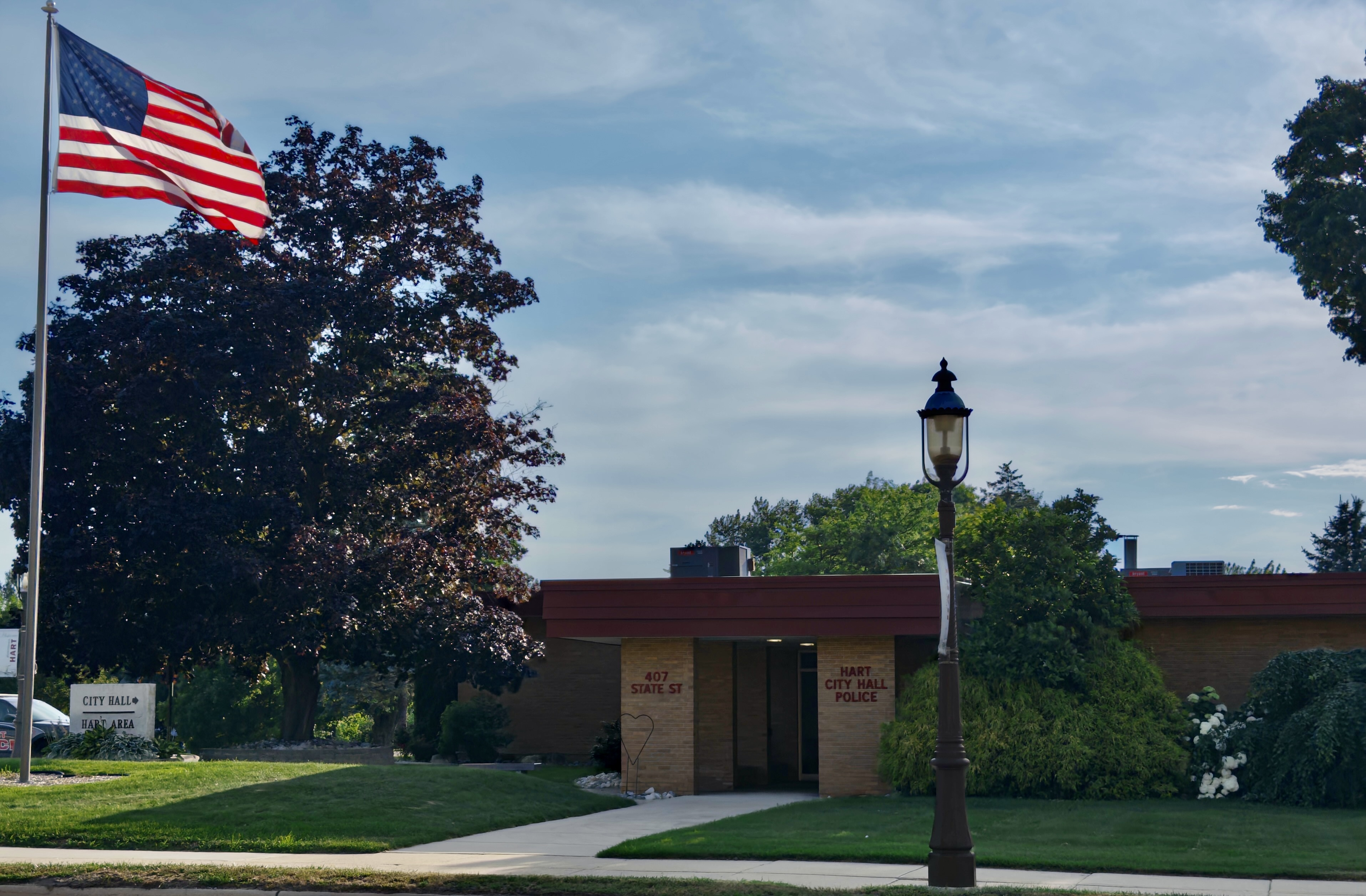
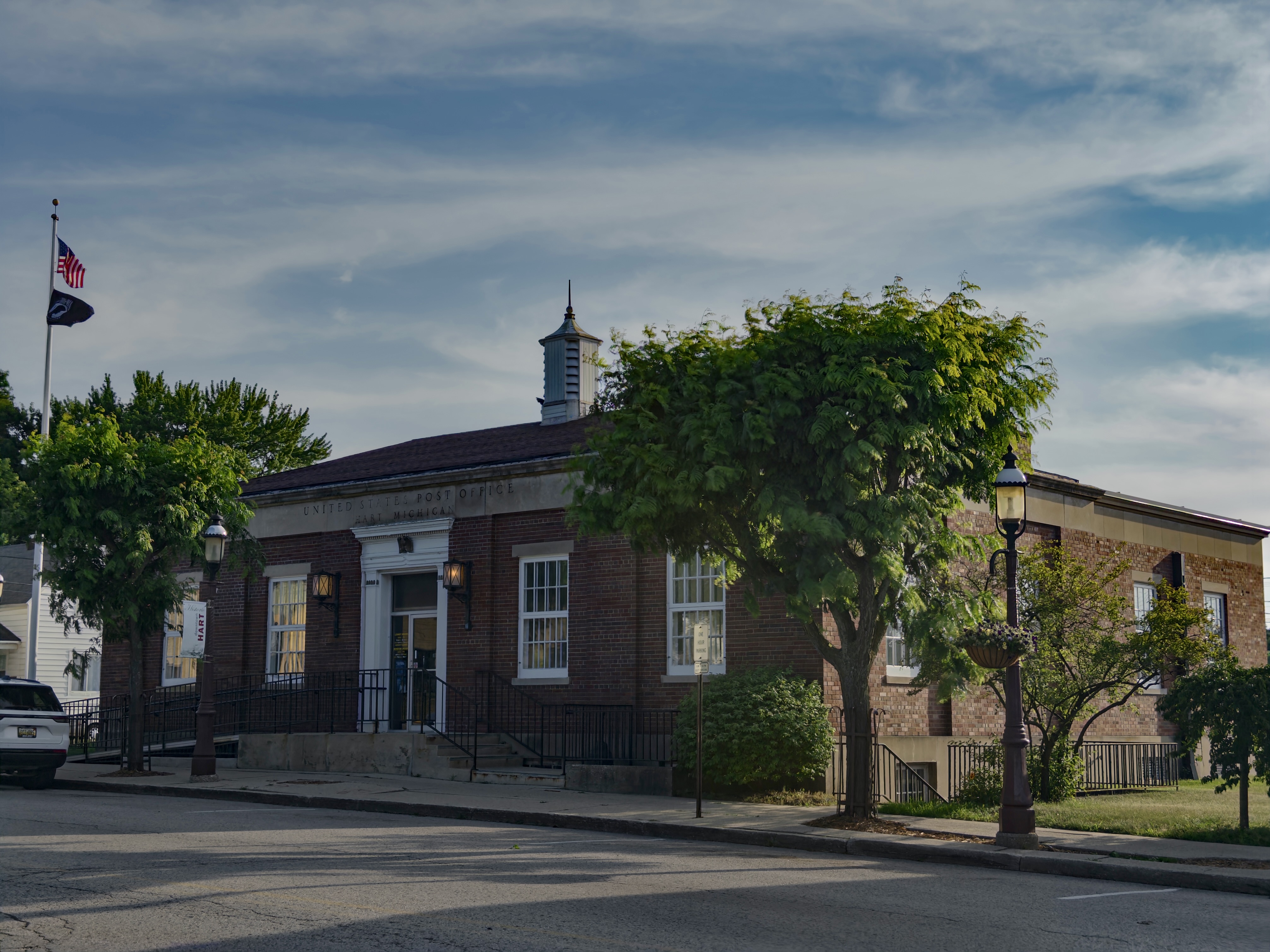
- Downtown City hall Post office

- Location of Hart, Michigan

- Location within Michigan Location within the United States
- Coordinates: 43°41′58″N 86°21′57″W
- Country: United States
- State: Michigan
- County: Oceana

Area
  - Total: 1.94 sq mi (5.02 km^{2})
  - Land: 1.78 sq mi (4.60 km^{2})
  - Water: 0.16 sq mi (0.42 km^{2})
- Elevation: 682 ft (208 m)

Population (2020)
  - Total: 2,053
  - Density: 1,160/sq mi (446/km^{2})
- Time zone: UTC-5 (Eastern (EST))
  - Summer (DST): UTC-4 (EDT)
- ZIP code: 49420
- Area code: 231
- FIPS code: 26-36920
- GNIS feature ID: 1620137
- Website: cityofhart.org

Hart is a city and county seat of Oceana County, Michigan. As of the 2020 census, Hart had a population of 2,053. The city is located within Hart Township, but is politically independent.

Hart is also home to the north end of the Hart-Montague Trail.

== History ==
Hart was named from its central position in the "heart" of Oceana County.

Hart was founded in 1856 by early pioneers including Nelson Grove. Hart Township was named after Wellington Hart.

== Geography ==
According to the United States Census Bureau, the city has a total area of 2.07 square miles (5.36 km^{2}), of which 1.91 square miles (4.95 km^{2}) is land and 0.16 square miles (0.41 km^{2}) is water.

=== Climate ===
This climatic region is typified by large seasonal temperature differences, with warm to hot (and often humid) summers and cold (sometimes severely cold) winters. According to the Köppen Climate Classification system, Hart has a humid continental climate, abbreviated "Dfb" on climate maps.

Climate data for Hart 3 WSW, Michigan (1991–2020 normals, extremes 1893–present)
Month	Jan	Feb	Mar	Apr	May	Jun	Jul	Aug	Sep	Oct	Nov	Dec	Year
Record high °F (°C)	59 (15)	65 (18)	82 (28)	86 (30)	95 (35)	99 (37)	104 (40)	102 (39)	97 (36)	87 (31)	75 (24)	68 (20)	104 (40)
Mean daily maximum °F (°C)	29.5 (−1.4)	31.9 (−0.1)	42.0 (5.6)	54.5 (12.5)	66.7 (19.3)	76.1 (24.5)	79.9 (26.6)	78.6 (25.9)	71.6 (22.0)	58.5 (14.7)	45.3 (7.4)	34.5 (1.4)	55.8 (13.2)
Daily mean °F (°C)	22.9 (−5.1)	24.1 (−4.4)	32.4 (0.2)	43.8 (6.6)	54.8 (12.7)	64.8 (18.2)	68.8 (20.4)	67.6 (19.8)	60.8 (16.0)	49.0 (9.4)	37.7 (3.2)	28.4 (−2.0)	46.3 (7.9)
Mean daily minimum °F (°C)	16.2 (−8.8)	16.3 (−8.7)	22.8 (−5.1)	33.1 (0.6)	43.0 (6.1)	53.6 (12.0)	57.7 (14.3)	56.6 (13.7)	50.0 (10.0)	39.4 (4.1)	30.2 (−1.0)	22.3 (−5.4)	36.8 (2.7)
Record low °F (°C)	−26 (−32)	−35 (−37)	−16 (−27)	1 (−17)	19 (−7)	26 (−3)	35 (2)	34 (1)	25 (−4)	18 (−8)	−18 (−28)	−19 (−28)	−35 (−37)
Average precipitation inches (mm)	2.75 (70)	1.96 (50)	2.37 (60)	3.63 (92)	4.45 (113)	3.72 (94)	3.53 (90)	3.27 (83)	3.23 (82)	3.96 (101)	3.43 (87)	2.60 (66)	38.90 (988)
Average snowfall inches (cm)	26.4 (67)	20.0 (51)	5.9 (15)	1.1 (2.8)	0.0 (0.0)	0.0 (0.0)	0.0 (0.0)	0.0 (0.0)	0.0 (0.0)	0.1 (0.25)	5.4 (14)	19.6 (50)	78.5 (199)
Average precipitation days (≥ 0.01 in)	15.6	12.7	9.2	11.7	11.1	9.9	9.2	8.3	9.5	13.2	13.0	13.6	137.0
Average snowy days (≥ 0.1 in)	12.8	9.3	4.3	1.2	0.0	0.0	0.0	0.0	0.0	0.1	2.9	9.6	40.2
Source: NOAA

== Demographics ==
Historical population
Census	Pop.	Note	%±
1870	213		—
1880	464		117.8%
1890	757		63.1%
1900	1,134		49.8%
1910	1,555		37.1%
1920	1,590		2.3%
1930	1,690		6.3%
1940	1,922		13.7%
1950	2,172		13.0%
1960	1,990		−8.4%
1970	2,139		7.5%
1980	1,888		−11.7%
1990	1,942		2.9%
2000	1,950		0.4%
2010	2,126		9.0%
2020	2,053		−3.4%
U.S. Decennial Census

=== 2020 census ===
As of the 2020 census, Hart had a population of 2,053. The median age was 40.3 years. 23.3% of residents were under the age of 18 and 21.4% of residents were 65 years of age or older. For every 100 females there were 93.7 males, and for every 100 females age 18 and over there were 89.9 males age 18 and over.

0.0% of residents lived in urban areas, while 100.0% lived in rural areas.

There were 727 households in Hart, of which 29.8% had children under the age of 18 living in them. Of all households, 39.2% were married-couple households, 20.4% were households with a male householder and no spouse or partner present, and 32.3% were households with a female householder and no spouse or partner present. About 33.4% of all households were made up of individuals and 14.0% had someone living alone who was 65 years of age or older.

There were 823 housing units, of which 11.7% were vacant. The homeowner vacancy rate was 3.2% and the rental vacancy rate was 5.0%.

Racial composition as of the 2020 census
Race	Number	Percent
White	1,490	72.6%
Black or African American	14	0.7%
American Indian and Alaska Native	48	2.3%
Asian	6	0.3%
Native Hawaiian and Other Pacific Islander	1	0.0%
Some other race	258	12.6%
Two or more races	236	11.5%
Hispanic or Latino (of any race)	591	28.8%

=== 2010 census ===
As of the census of 2010, there were 2,126 people, 757 households, and 478 families living in the city. The population density was 1,113.1 inhabitants per square mile (429.8/km^{2}). There were 849 housing units at an average density of 444.5 per square mile (171.6/km^{2}). The racial makeup of the city was 84.3% White, 0.5% African American, 0.8% Native American, 0.2% Asian, 12.6% from other races, and 1.6% from two or more races. Hispanic or Latino of any race were 25.7% of the population.

There were 757 households, of which 35.3% had children under the age of 18 living with them, 41.9% were married couples living together, 17.3% had a female householder with no husband present, 4.0% had a male householder with no wife present, and 36.9% were non-families. 32.9% of all households were made up of individuals, and 14.8% had someone living alone who was 65 years of age or older. The average household size was 2.58 and the average family size was 3.23.

The median age in the city was 37.3 years. 26.4% of residents were under the age of 18; 8.8% were between the ages of 18 and 24; 22.7% were from 25 to 44; 22.1% were from 45 to 64; and 19.9% were 65 years of age or older. The gender makeup of the city was 48.2% male and 51.8% female.

=== 2000 census ===
As of the census of 2000, there were 1,950 people, 759 households, and 481 families living in the city. The population density was 1,017.7 inhabitants per square mile (392.9/km^{2}). There were 832 housing units at an average density of 434.2 per square mile (167.6/km^{2}). The racial makeup of the city was 87.69% White, 0.51% African American, 1.38% Native American, 0.26% Asian, 7.59% from other races, and 2.56% from two or more races. Hispanic or Latino of any race were 14.56% of the population.

There were 759 households, out of which 31.6% had children under the age of 18 living with them, 44.7% were married couples living together, 13.8% had a female householder with no husband present, and 36.6% were non-families. 31.6% of all households were made up of individuals, and 16.3% had someone living alone who was 65 years of age or older. The average household size was 2.45 and the average family size was 3.05.

In the city, the population was spread out, with 27.4% under the age of 18, 8.3% from 18 to 24, 28.8% from 25 to 44, 18.3% from 45 to 64, and 17.2% who were 65 years of age or older. The median age was 35 years. For every 100 females, there were 90.2 males. For every 100 females age 18 and over, there were 87.4 males.

The median income for a household in the city was $25,855, and the median income for a family was $31,875. Males had a median income of $28,839 versus $20,125 for females. The per capita income for the city was $13,844. About 17.5% of families and 20.4% of the population were below the poverty line, including 30.6% of those under age 18 and 10.0% of those age 65 or over.

== Education ==
The city is in Hart Public School District.

== Transportation ==
- US 31 / LMCT passes west of the city, continuing southerly toward Muskegon and northerly toward Ludington.
- Bus. US 31 is a spur route into downtown Hart.

== Notable people ==
- Larry Paul Kelley, founder of Shelby Gem Factory
- Seymour H. Knox I, Buffalo, New York businessman
- Donald W. Wolf, World War II U.S. Marine Corps soldier who was killed in action at Guadalcanal
- Walter Willett, physician and nutrition researcher
- George Winston, instrumental pop pianist and composer (b. 1949)
