= Electroceramics =

Class of materials used for electrical properties

Electroceramics are a class of ceramic materials used primarily for their electrical properties.

While ceramics have traditionally been admired and used for their mechanical, thermal and chemical stability, their unique electrical, optical and magnetic properties have become of increasing importance in many key technologies including communications, energy conversion and storage, electronics and automation. Such materials are now classified under electroceramics, as distinguished from other functional ceramics such as advanced structural ceramics.

Historically, developments in the various subclasses of electroceramics have paralleled the growth of new technologies. Examples include: ferroelectrics - high dielectric capacitors, non-volatile memories; ferrites - data and information storage; solid electrolytes - energy storage and conversion; piezoelectrics - sonar; semiconducting oxides - environmental monitoring.

== Dielectric ceramics ==
Dielectric materials used for construction of ceramic capacitors include: Lead Zirconate titanate (PZT), Barium titanate(BT), strontium titanate (ST), calcium titanate (CT), magnesium titanate (MT), calcium magnesium titanate (CMT), zinc titanate (ZT), lanthanum titanate (LT), and neodymium titanate (NT), barium zirconate (BZ), calcium zirconate (CZ), lead magnesium niobate (PMN), lead zinc niobate (PZN), lithium niobate (LN), barium stannate (BS), calcium stannate (CS), magnesium aluminium silicate, magnesium silicate, barium tantalate, titanium dioxide, niobium oxide, zirconia, silica, sapphire, beryllium oxide, and zirconium tin titanate

Some piezoelectric materials can be used as well; the EIA Class 2 dielectrics are based on mixtures rich on barium titanate. In turn, EIA Class 1 dielectrics contain little or no barium titanate.

== Electronically conductive ceramics ==
Indium tin oxide (ITO), lanthanum-doped strontium titanate (SLT), yttrium-doped strontium titanate (SYT)

== Fast ion conductor ceramics ==
Yttria-stabilized zirconia (YSZ), gadolinium-doped ceria (GDC), lanthanum strontium gallate magnesite(LSGM), beta alumina, beta alumina

== Piezoelectric and ferroelectric ceramics ==
Commercially used piezoceramic is primarily lead zirconate titanate (PZT). Barium titanate (BT), strontium titanate (ST), quartz, and others are also used.

See Category:Piezoelectric materials.

== Magnetic ceramics ==
Ferrites including iron(III) oxide and strontium carbonate display magnetic properties. Lanthanum strontium manganite exhibits colossal magnetoresistance.

== See also ==
- Ceramic
- Genoa Joint Laboratories
- Strontium titanate
- Barium titanate
- Lead zirconate titanate
