= GJL =

GJL may refer to:

- Gender Justice League
- Genoa Joint Laboratories
- Glasgow Junior Football League
- Jijel Ferhat Abbas Airport, in Algeria
