= Cubic zirconia =

Cubic crystalline form of zirconium dioxide

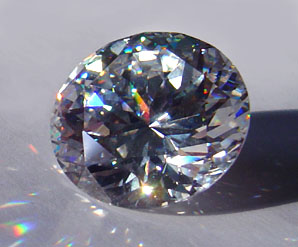
- A round brilliant-cut cubic zirconia

General
- Category: Oxide minerals
- Crystal system: Cubic

Identification
- Color: Various
- Mohs scale hardness: 8.0–8.5
- Specific gravity: 5.6–6.0 g/cm^{3}
- Refractive index: 2.15–2.18

Cubic zirconia (CZ) is the cubic crystalline form of zirconium dioxide (ZrO_{2}). The synthesized material is hard and usually colorless, but may be made in a variety of different colors. It should not be confused with zircon, which is a zirconium silicate (ZrSiO_{4}). It is sometimes erroneously called cubic zirconium.

Because of its low cost, durability, and close visual likeness to diamond, synthetic cubic zirconia has remained the most gemologically and economically important competitor for diamonds since commercial production began in 1976. Its main competitor as a synthetic gemstone is a more recently cultivated material, synthetic moissanite.

== Technical aspects ==
Cubic zirconia is crystallographically isometric, an important attribute of a would-be diamond simulant. During synthesis zirconium oxide naturally forms monoclinic crystals, which are stable under normal atmospheric conditions. A stabilizer is required for cubic crystals (taking on the fluorite structure) to form, and remain stable at ordinary temperatures; typically this is either yttrium or calcium oxide, the amount of stabilizer used depending on the many recipes of individual manufacturers. Therefore, the physical and optical properties of synthesized CZ vary, all values being ranges.

It is a dense substance, with a density between 5.6 and 6.0 g/cm^{3}—about 1.65 times that of diamond. Cubic zirconia is relatively hard, 8–8.5 on the Mohs scale—slightly harder than most semi-precious natural gems. Its refractive index is high at 2.15–2.18 (compared to 2.42 for diamonds) and its luster is Adamantine lustre. Its dispersion is very high at 0.058–0.066, exceeding that of diamond (0.044). Cubic zirconia has no cleavage and exhibits a conchoidal fracture. Because of its high hardness, it is generally considered brittle.

Under shortwave UV cubic zirconia typically fluoresces a yellow, greenish yellow or "beige". Under longwave UV the effect is greatly diminished, with a whitish glow sometimes being seen. Colored stones may show a strong, complex rare earth absorption spectrum.

== History ==
Discovered in 1892, the yellowish monoclinic mineral baddeleyite is a natural form of zirconium oxide.

The high melting point of zirconia (2750 °C or 4976 °F) hinders controlled growth of single crystals. However, stabilization of cubic zirconium oxide had been realized early on, with the synthetic product stabilized zirconia introduced in 1929. Although cubic, it was in the form of a polycrystalline ceramic: it was used as a refractory material, highly resistant to chemical and thermal attack (up to 2540 °C or 4604 °F).

In 1937, German mineralogists M. V. Stackelberg and K. Chudoba discovered naturally occurring cubic zirconia in the form of microscopic grains included in metamict zircon. This was thought to be a byproduct of the metamictization process, but the two scientists did not think the mineral important enough to give it a formal name. The discovery was confirmed through X-ray diffraction, proving the existence of a natural counterpart to the synthetic product.

As with the majority of grown diamond substitutes, the idea of producing single-crystal cubic zirconia arose in the minds of scientists seeking a new and versatile material for use in lasers and other optical applications. Its production eventually exceeded that of earlier synthetics, such as synthetic strontium titanate, synthetic rutile, YAG (yttrium aluminium garnet) and GGG (gadolinium gallium garnet).

Some of the earliest research into controlled single-crystal growth of cubic zirconia occurred in 1960s France, much work being done by Y. Roulin and R. Collongues. This technique involved molten zirconia being contained within a thin shell of still-solid zirconia, with crystal growth from the melt. The process was named cold crucible, an allusion to the system of water cooling used. Though promising, these attempts yielded only small crystals.

Later, Soviet scientists under V. V. Osiko in the Laser Equipment Laboratory at the Lebedev Physical Institute in Moscow perfected the technique, which was then named skull crucible (an allusion either to the shape of the water-cooled container or to the form of crystals sometimes grown). They named the jewel Fianit after the institute's name FIAN (Physical Institute of the Academy of Science), but the name was not used outside of the USSR. This was known at the time as the Institute of Physics at the Russian Academy of Science. Their breakthrough was published in 1973, and commercial production began in 1976. In 1977, cubic zirconia began to be mass-produced in the jewelry marketplace by the Ceres Corporation, with crystals stabilized with 94% yttria. Other major producers as of 1993 include Taiwan Crystal Company Ltd, Swarovski and ICT inc. By 1980, annual global production had reached 60 million carats (12 tonnes) and continued to increase, with production reaching around 400 tonnes per year in 1998.

Because the natural form of cubic zirconia is so rare, all cubic zirconia used in jewelry has been synthesized, one method of which was patented by Josep F. Wenckus & Co. in 1997.

== Synthesis ==
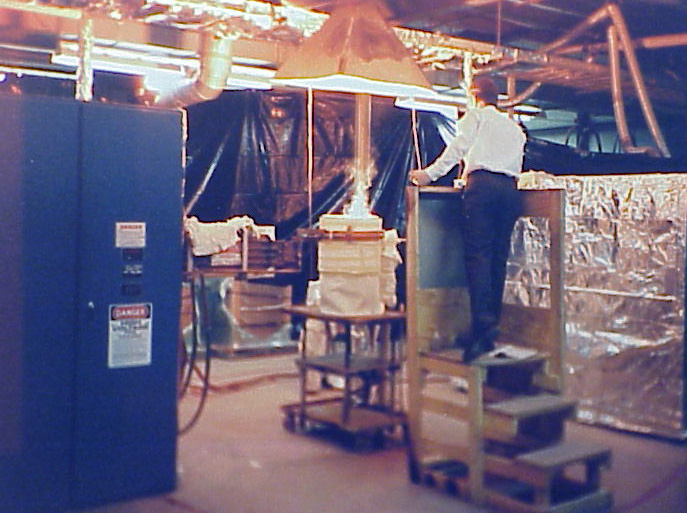
Worker monitoring melting zirconium oxide and yttrium oxide in an induction-heated "cold crucible" to create cubic zirconia

The skull-melting method refined by Josep F. Wenckus and coworkers in 1997 remains the industry standard. This is largely due to the process allowing for temperatures of over 3000 °C to be achieved, lack of contact between crucible and material as well as the freedom to choose any gas atmosphere. Primary downsides to this method include the inability to predict the size of the crystals produced and it is impossible to control the crystallization process through temperature changes.

The apparatus used in this process consists of a cup-shaped crucible surrounded by radio frequency-activated (RF-activated) copper coils and a water-cooling system.

Zirconium dioxide thoroughly mixed with a stabilizer (normally 10% yttrium oxide) is fed into a cold crucible. Metallic chips of either zirconium or the stabilizer are introduced into the powder mix in a compact pile manner. The RF generator is switched on and the metallic chips quickly start heating up and readily oxidize into more zirconia. Consequently, the surrounding powder heats up by thermal conduction, begins melting and, in turn, becomes electroconductive, and thus it begins to heat up via the RF generator as well. This continues until the entire product is molten. Due to the cooling system surrounding the crucible, a thin shell of sintered solid material is formed. This causes the molten zirconia to remain contained within its own powder which prevents it from being contaminated from the crucible and reduces heat loss. The melt is left at high temperatures for some hours to ensure homogeneity and ensure that all impurities have evaporated. Finally, the entire crucible is slowly removed from the RF coils to reduce the heating and let it slowly cool down (from bottom to top). The rate at which the crucible is removed from the RF coils is chosen as a function of the stability of crystallization dictated by the phase transition diagram. This provokes the crystallization process to begin and useful crystals begin to form. Once the crucible has been completely cooled to room temperature, the resulting crystals are multiple elongated-crystalline blocks.

This shape is dictated by a concept known as crystal degeneration according to Tiller. The size and diameter of the obtained crystals is a function of the cross-sectional area of the crucible, volume of the melt and composition of the melt. The diameter of the crystals is heavily influenced by the concentration of Y_{2}O_{3} stabilizer.

=== Phase relations in zirconia solids solutions ===
As seen on the phase diagram, the cubic phase will crystallize first as the solution is cooled down no matter the concentration of Y_{2}O_{3}. If the concentration of Y_{2}O_{3} is not high enough the cubic structure will start to break down into the tetragonal state which will then break down into a monoclinic phase. If the concentration of Y_{2}O_{3} is between 2.5–5% the resulting product will be PSZ (partially stabilized zirconia) while monophasic cubic crystals will form from around 8–40%. Below 14% at low growth rates tend to be opaque indicating partial phase separation in the solid solution (likely due to diffusion in the crystals remaining in the high temperature region for a longer time). Above this threshold crystals tend to remain clear at reasonable growth rates and maintains good annealing conditions.

=== Doping ===
Because of cubic zirconia's isomorphic capacity, it can be doped with several elements to change the color of the crystal. A list of specific dopants and colors produced by their addition can be seen below.

Dopant	Symbol	Color(s)
Cerium	Ce	yellow-orange-red
Chromium	Cr	green
Cobalt	Co	lilac-violet-blue
Copper	Cu	yellow-aqua
Erbium	Er	pink
Europium	Eu	pink
Iron	Fe	yellow
Holmium	Ho	Champagne
Manganese	Mn	brown-violet
Neodymium	Nd	purple
Nickel	Ni	yellow-brown
Praseodymium	Pr	amber
Thulium	Tm	yellow-brown
Titanium	Ti	golden brown
Vanadium	V	green

Color Range	Dopant Used
yellow-orange-red	CeO_{2}, Ce_{2}O_{3}
yellow-amber-brown	CuO, Fe_{2}O_{3}, NiO, Pr_{2}O_{3}, TiO_{2}
pink	Er_{2}O_{3}, Eu_{2}O_{3}, Ho_{2}O_{3}
green-olive	Cr_{2}O_{3}, Tm_{2}O_{3}, V_{2}O_{3}
lilac-violet	Co_{2}O_{3}, MnO_{2}, Nd_{2}O_{3}

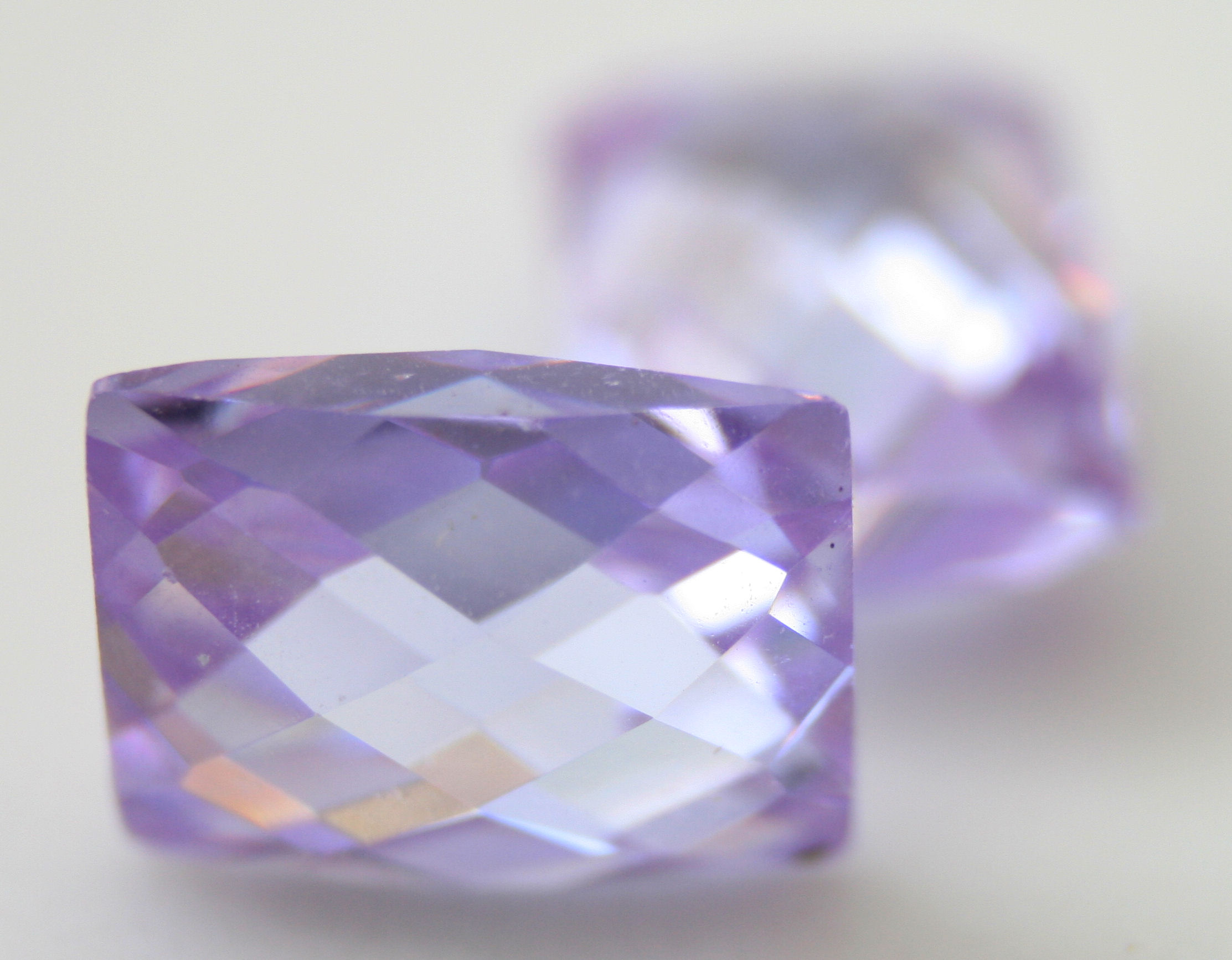
Purple cubic zirconia with checkerboard cut

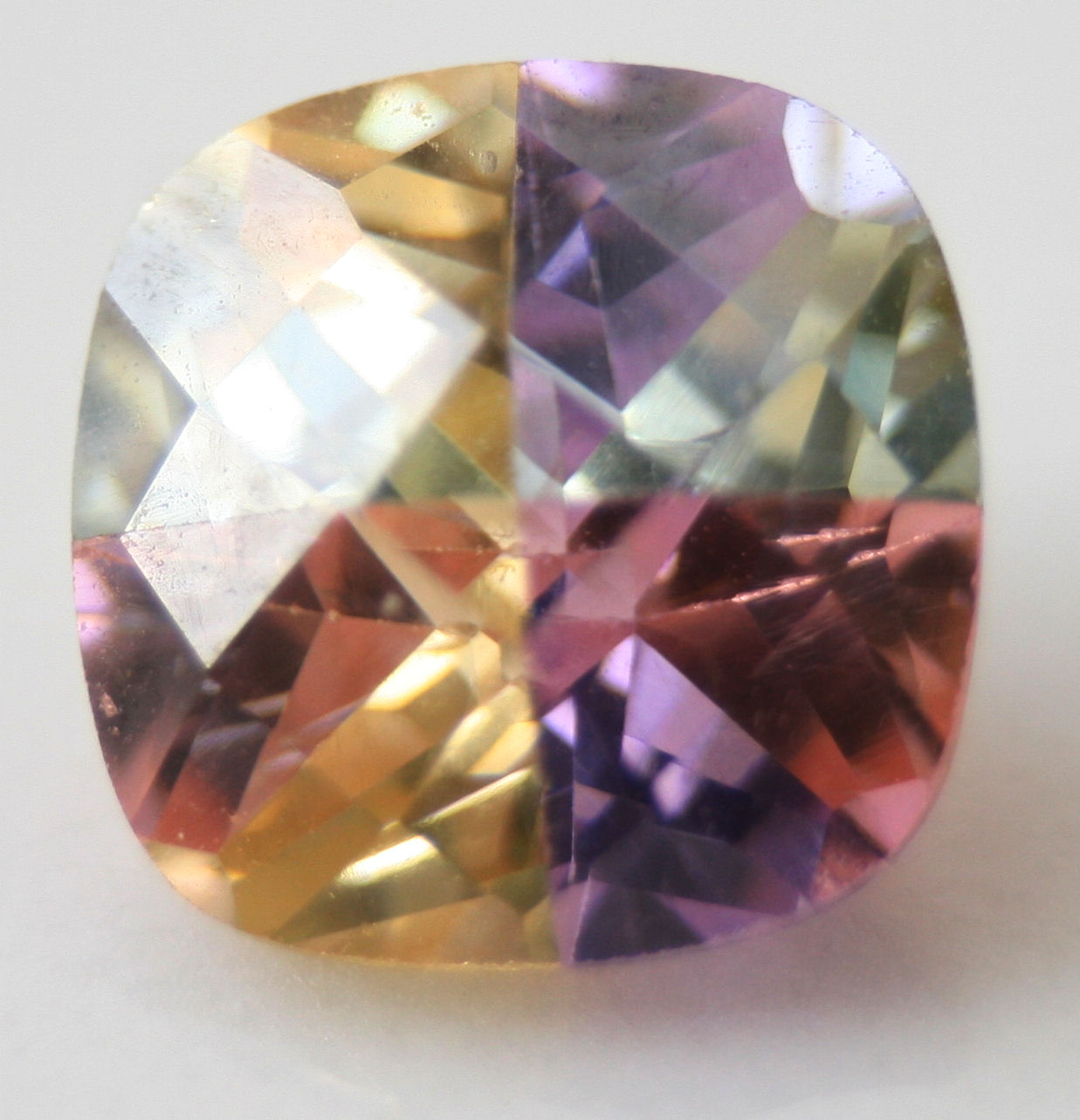
Multi-color cubic zirconia

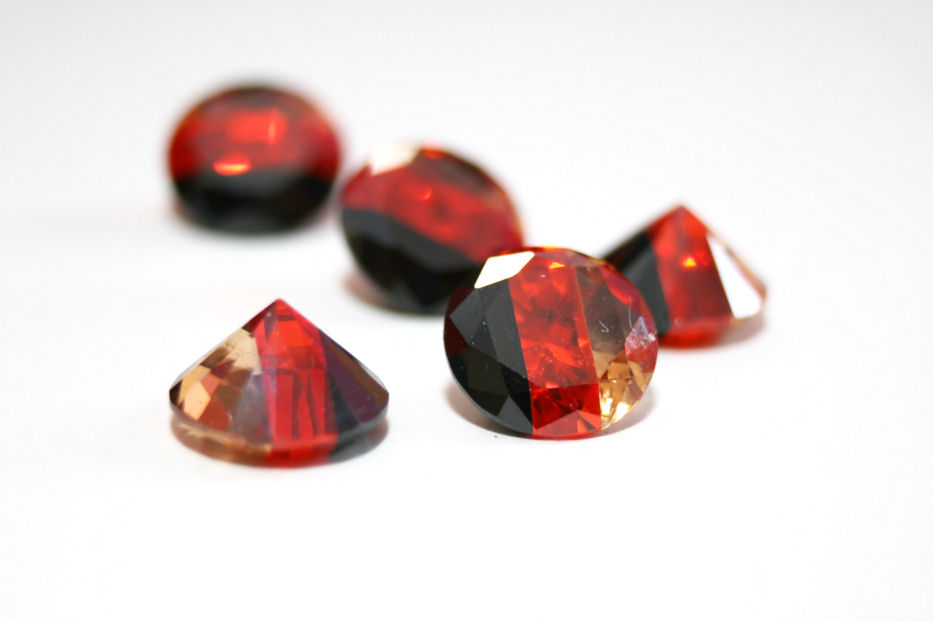
Three-tone cubic zirconia gems

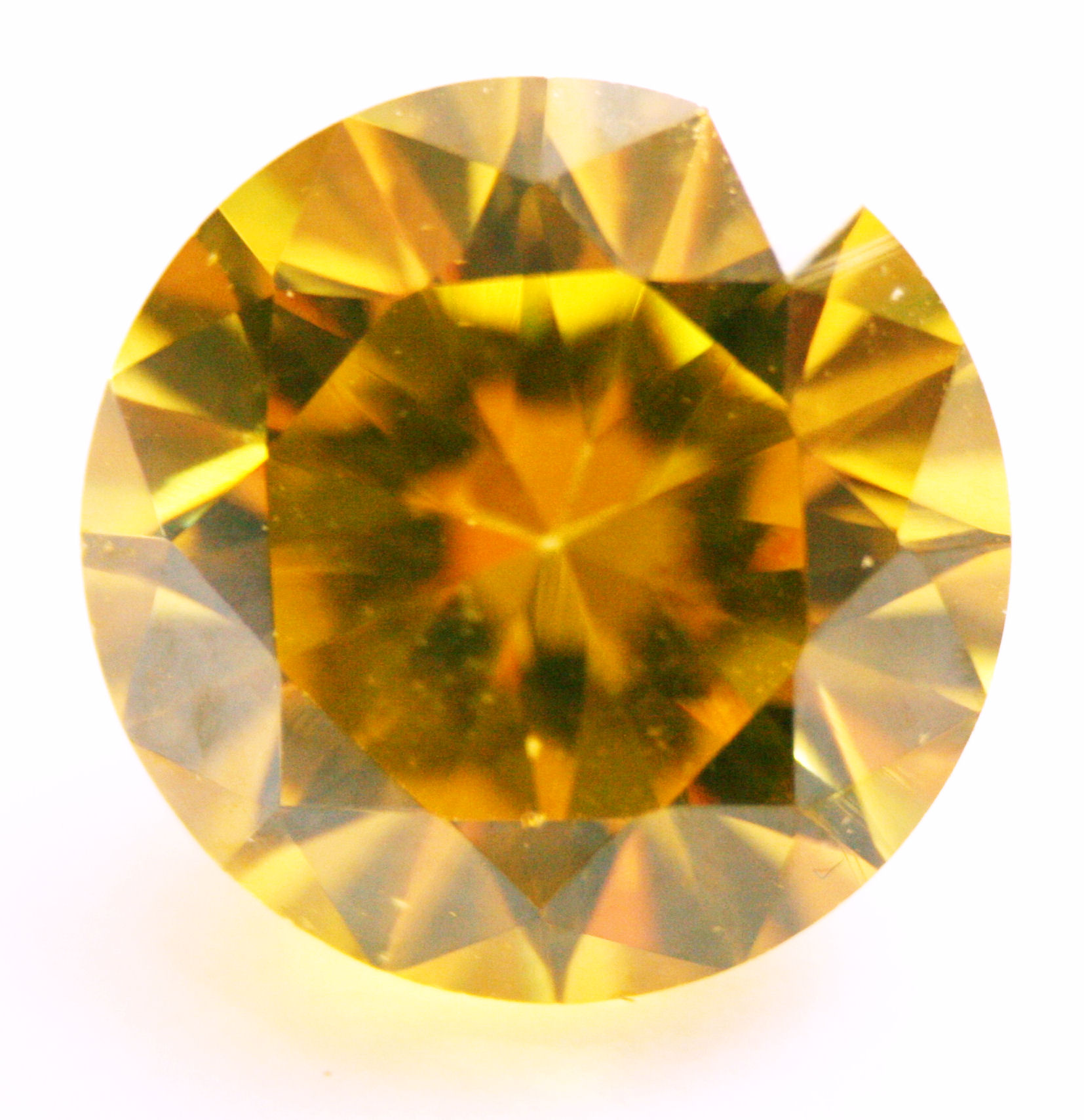
Yellow cubic zirconia

=== Primary growth defects ===
The vast majority of YCZ (yttrium bearing cubic zirconia) crystals are clear with high optical perfection and with gradients of the refractive index lower than 5×10^{−5}. However some samples contain defects with the most characteristic and common ones listed below.

- Growth striations: These are located perpendicular to the growth direction of the crystal and are caused mainly by either fluctuations in the crystal growth rate or the non-congruent nature of liquid-solid transition, thus leading to non-uniform distribution of Y_{2}O_{3}.
- Light-scattering phase inclusions: Caused by contaminants in the crystal (primarily precipitates of silicates or aluminates of yttrium), typically of magnitude 0.03–10 μm.
- Mechanical stresses: Typically caused by the high temperature gradients of the growth and cooling processes, causing the crystal to form with internal mechanical stresses acting on it. This causes refractive index values of up to 8×10^{−4}, although the effect of this can be reduced by annealing at 2100 °C followed by a slow enough cooling process.
- Dislocations: Similar to mechanical stresses, dislocations can be greatly reduced by annealing.

== Uses outside jewelry ==
Due to its optical properties, yttrium cubic zirconia (YCZ) has been used for windows, lenses, prisms, filters and laser elements. Particularly in the chemical industry, it is used as window material for the monitoring of corrosive liquids due to its chemical stability and mechanical toughness. YCZ has also been used as a substrate for semiconductor and superconductor films in similar industries.

Mechanical properties of partially stabilized zirconia (high hardness and shock resistance, low friction coefficient, high chemical and thermal resistance, high wear and tear resistance) allow it to be used as a very particular building material, especially in the bio-engineering industry: It has been used to make reliable super-sharp medical scalpels for doctors that are compatible with bio-tissues and contain an edge much smoother than one made of steel.

== Innovations ==
Manufacturers have sought ways to distinguish their product by supposedly "improving" cubic zirconia. Coating finished cubic zirconia with a film of diamond-like carbon (DLC) is one such innovation, a process using chemical vapor deposition. The resulting material is purportedly harder, more lustrous and more like diamond overall. The coating is thought to quench the excess fire of cubic zirconia, while improving its refractive index, thus making it appear more like diamond. Additionally, because of the high percentage of diamond bonds in the amorphous diamond coating, the finished simulant will show a positive diamond signature in Raman spectra.

Another technique first applied to quartz and topaz has also been adapted to cubic zirconia: An iridescent effect created by vacuum-sputtering onto finished stones an extremely thin layer of a precious metal (typically gold), or certain metal oxides, metal nitrides, or other coatings. This material is marketed as "mystic" by many dealers. Unlike diamond-like carbon and other hard synthetic ceramic coatings, the iridescent effect made with precious metal coatings is not durable, due to their extremely low hardness and poor abrasion wear properties, compared to the remarkably durable cubic zirconia substrate.

== Comparison with diamond ==
Key features of cubic zirconia distinguish it from diamond:

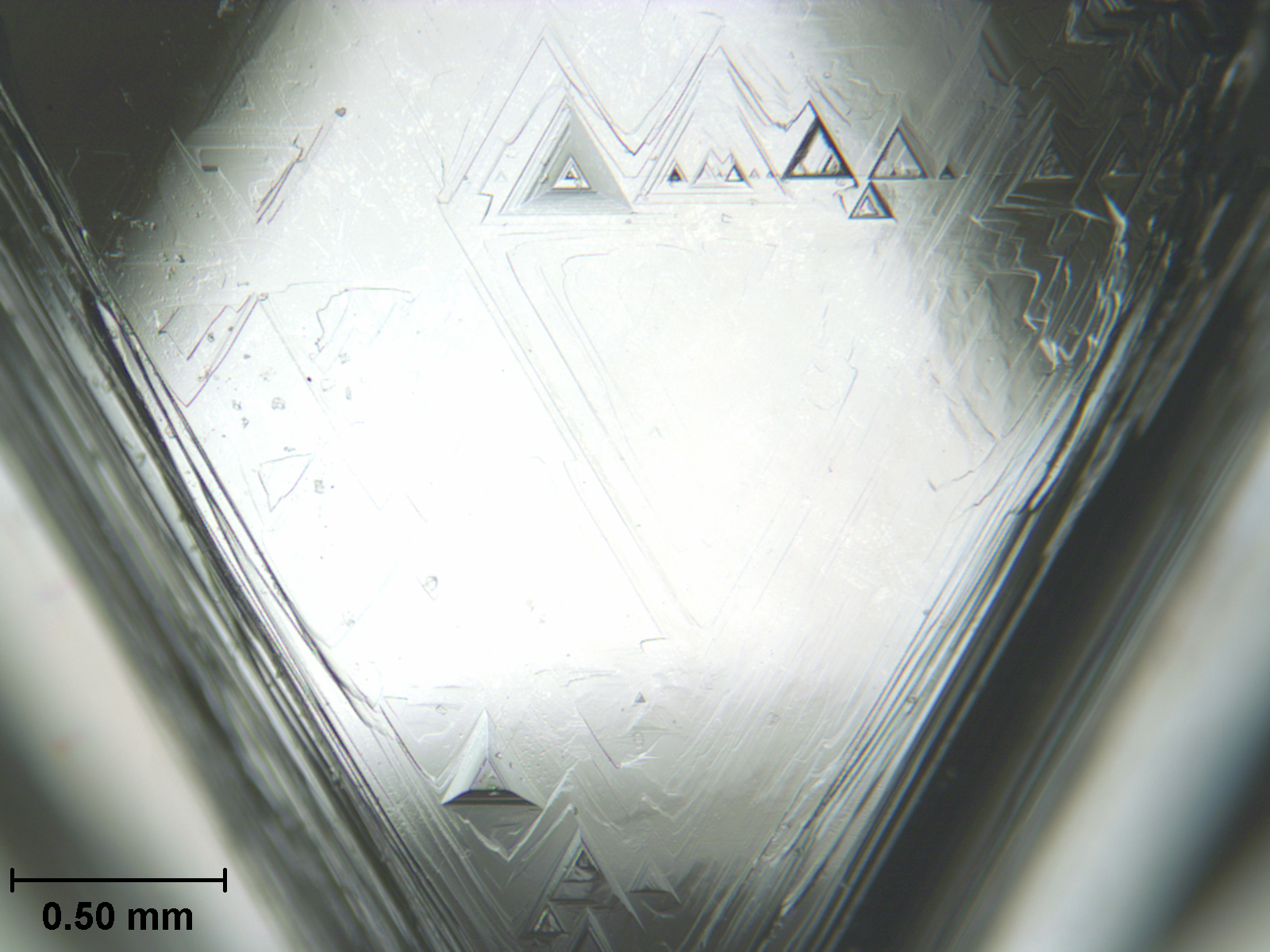
One face of an uncut octahedral diamond, showing trigons (of positive and negative relief) formed by natural chemical etching

- Hardness: cubic zirconia has a rating of approximately 8 on Mohs hardness scale vs. a rating of 10 for diamond. This may cause dull and rounded edges in CZ facets; the edges of diamond facets are much sharper by comparison. Furthermore, diamond rarely shows polish marks, and those which are apparent are oriented in different directions on adjoining facets, whereas CZ shows marks in the same direction of the polish throughout.
- The specific gravity or density of cubic zirconia is approximately 1.7 times that of diamond. This allows gemologists to differentiate the two substances by weight alone. This property can also be exploited, for example, by dropping the stones in a heavy liquid and comparing their relative rates of descent: diamond will sink more slowly than CZ.
- Refractive index: cubic zirconia has a refractive index of 2.15–2.18, compared to a diamond's 2.42. This has led to the development of other immersion techniques for identification. In these methods, stones with refractive indices higher than that of the liquid used will have dark borders around the girdle and light facet edges whereas those with indices lower than the liquid will have light borders around the girdle and dark facet junctions.
- Dispersion is very high at 0.058–0.066, exceeding a diamond's 0.044.
- Cut: Cubic zirconia gemstones can be cut differently from diamonds: The facet edges can be rounded or "smooth".
- Color: only the rarest of diamonds are truly colorless, most having a tinge of yellow or brown to some extent. A cubic zirconia is often entirely colorless: equivalent to a perfect "D" on diamond's color grading scale. That said, desirable colors of cubic zirconia can be produced, including near colorless, yellow, pink, purple, green, and even multicolored.
- Thermal conductivity: Cubic zirconia is a thermal insulator whereas diamond is a strong thermal conductor. This provides the basis for Wenckus’ canonical identification method, the industry standard.

=== Effects on the diamond market ===
Cubic zirconia, as a diamond simulant and jewel competitor, can potentially reduce demand for conflict diamonds, and affect the controversy surrounding the rarity and value of diamonds.

Regarding value, the paradigm that diamonds are costly due to their rarity and visual beauty has been replaced by an artificial rarity attributed to price-fixing practices of De Beers Company which held a monopoly on the market from the 1870s to early 2000s. The company pleaded guilty to these charges in an Ohio court on 13 July 2004. However, while De Beers has less market power, the price of diamonds continues to increase due to the demand in emerging markets, such as India and China. The emergence of artificial stones, such as cubic zirconia, with optic properties similar to diamonds could be an alternative for jewelry buyers given their lower price and noncontroversial history.

An issue closely related to monopoly is the emergence of conflict diamonds. The Kimberley Process (KP) was established to deter the illicit trade of diamonds that fund civil wars in Angola and Sierra Leone. However, the KP is not as effective in decreasing the number of conflict diamonds reaching the European and American markets. Its definition does not include forced labor conditions or human rights violations. A 2015 study from the Enough Project, showed that groups in the Central African Republic have reaped between US$3 million and US$6 million annually from conflict diamonds. UN reports show that more than US$24 million in conflict diamonds have been smuggled since the establishment of the KP. Diamond simulants have become an alternative to boycott the funding of unethical practices. Terms such as “Eco-friendly Jewelry” define them as conflict free origin and environmentally sustainable. However, concerns from mining countries such as the Democratic Republic of Congo are that a boycott in purchases of diamonds would only worsen their economy. According to the Ministry of Mines in Congo, 10% of its population relies on the income from diamonds. Therefore, cubic zirconia are a short term alternative to reduce conflict but a long-term solution would be to establish a more rigorous system of identifying the origin of these stones.

== See also ==
- Shelby Gem Factory
- Synthetic diamond
- Yttria-stabilized zirconia
- Zircon
