= Zirconium dioxide =

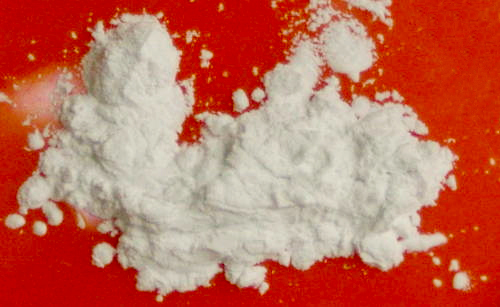

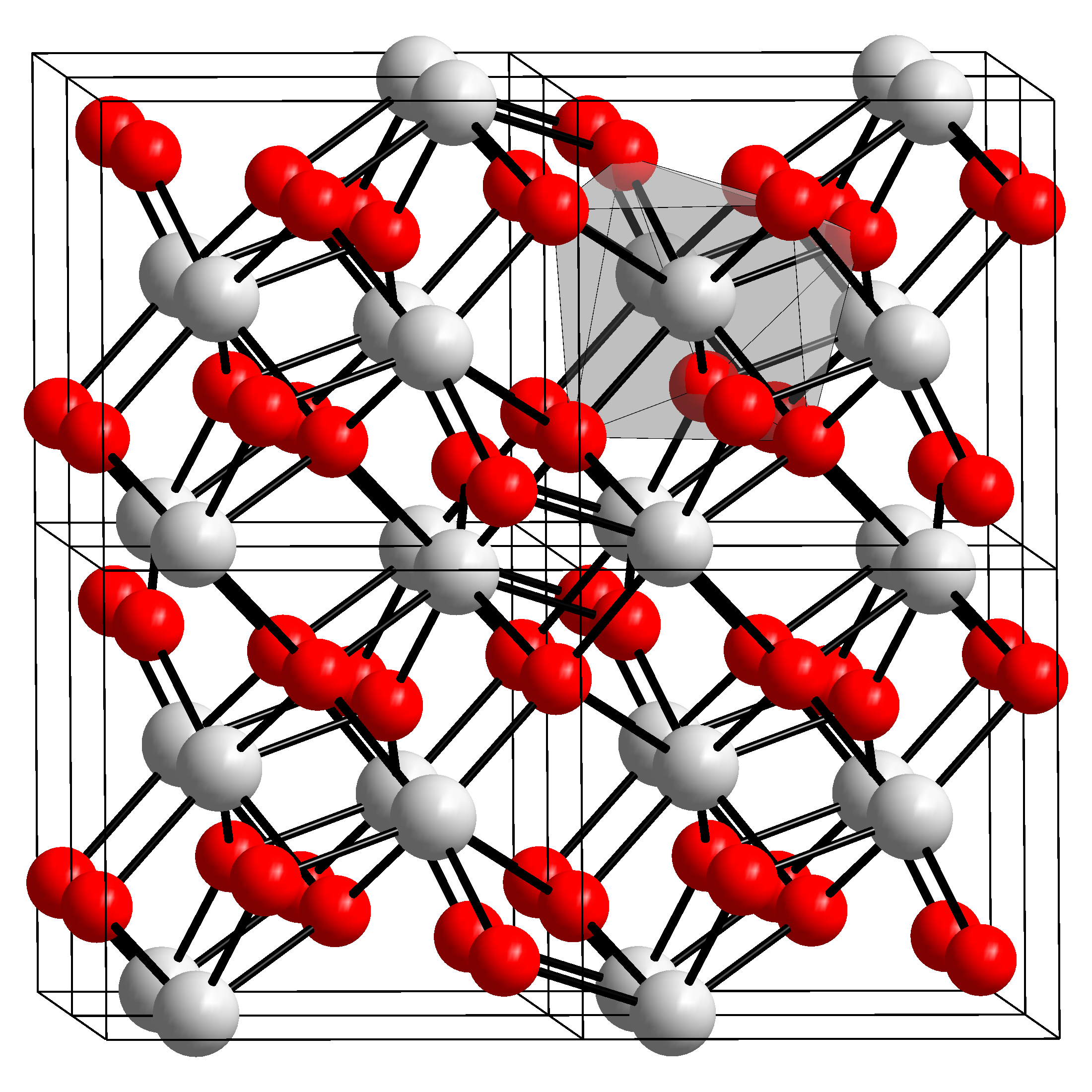
- Tetragonal crystal structure of zirconium dioxide

Names
- IUPAC names Zirconium dioxide Zirconium(IV) oxide
- Other names Zirconia; Baddeleyite

Identifiers
CAS Number	1314-23-4
3D model (JSmol)	Interactive image
ChemSpider	56183
ECHA InfoCard	100.013.844
EC Number	215-227-2
PubChem CID	62395
UNII	S38N85C5G0
CompTox Dashboard (EPA)	DTXSID301315847 DTXSID1042520, DTXSID301315847
- InChI: InChI=1S/2O.Zr Key: MCMNRKCIXSYSNV-UHFFFAOYSA-N
- SMILES: O=[Zr]=O

Properties
Chemical formula	ZrO_{2}
Molar mass	123.218 g/mol
Appearance	white powder
Density	5.68 g/cm^{3}
Melting point	2,715 °C (4,919 °F; 2,988 K)
Boiling point	4,300 °C (7,770 °F; 4,570 K)
Solubility in water	negligible
Solubility	soluble in HF, and hot H_{2}SO_{4}
Refractive index (n_{D})	2.13

Thermochemistry
Std molar entropy (S^{⦵}_{298})	50.3 J K^{−1} mol^{−1}
Std enthalpy of formation (Δ_{f}H^{⦵}_{298})	−1080 kJ/mol

Hazards
- GHS labelling
Pictograms	(GHS07: Exclamation mark)
Signal word	Warning
Hazard statements	H315, H319, H335
Precautionary statements	P261, P264, P271, P280, P302+P352, P304+P340, P305+P351+P338, P312, P321, P332+P313, P337+P313, P362, P403+P233, P405, P501
Flash point	Non-flammable
- Lethal dose or concentration (LD, LC)
LD_{50} (median dose)	> 8.8 g/kg (oral, rat)
Safety data sheet (SDS)	MSDS

Related compounds
Other anions	Zirconium disulfide
Other cations	Titanium dioxide Hafnium dioxide
- Except where otherwise noted, data are given for materials in their standard state (at 25 °C [77 °F], 100 kPa). verify (what is ?) Infobox references

Zirconium dioxide (ZrO_{2}), sometimes known as zirconia (not to be confused with zirconium silicate or zircon), is a white crystalline oxide of zirconium. Its most naturally occurring form, with a monoclinic crystalline structure, is the mineral baddeleyite. A dopant stabilized cubic structured zirconia, cubic zirconia, is synthesized in various colours for use as a gemstone and a diamond simulant.

== Production, chemical properties, occurrence ==
Zirconia is produced by calcining zirconium compounds, exploiting its high thermostability.

=== Structure ===
Three phases are known: monoclinic below 1170 °C, tetragonal between 1170 °C and 2370 °C, and cubic above 2370 °C.

The trend is for higher symmetry at higher temperatures, as is usually the case. A small percentage of the oxides of calcium or yttrium stabilize in the cubic phase. The very rare mineral tazheranite, (Zr,Ti,Ca)O_{2}, is cubic. Unlike TiO_{2}, which features six-coordinated titanium in all phases, monoclinic zirconia consists of seven-coordinated zirconium centres. This difference is attributed to the larger size of the zirconium atom relative to the titanium atom.

=== Chemical reactions ===
Zirconia is chemically unreactive. It is slowly attacked by concentrated hydrofluoric acid and sulfuric acid. When heated with carbon, it converts to zirconium carbide. When heated with carbon in the presence of chlorine, it converts to zirconium(IV) chloride. This conversion is the basis for the purification of zirconium metal and is analogous to the Kroll process.

== Engineering properties ==
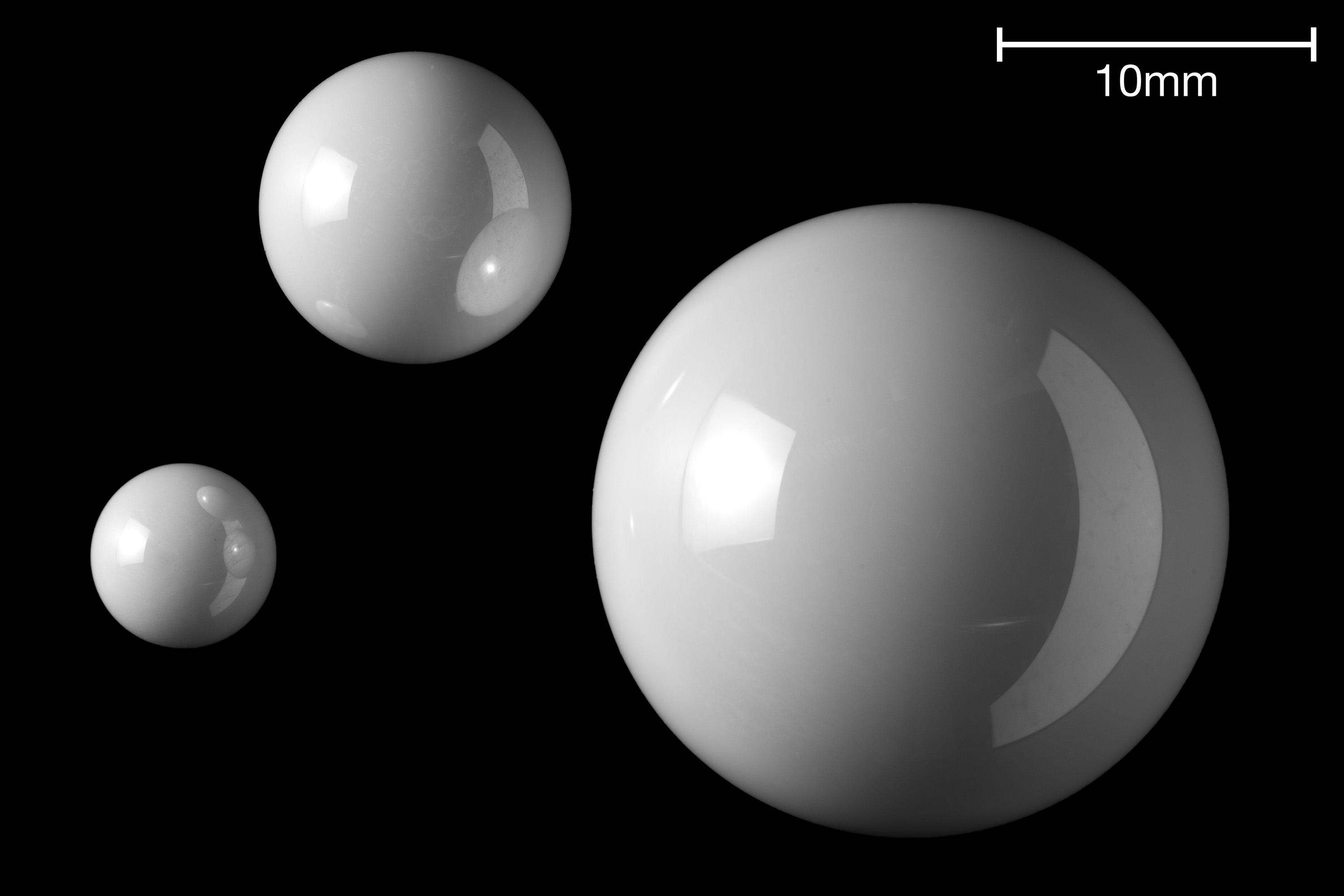
Bearing balls

Zirconium dioxide is one of the most studied ceramic materials. ZrO_{2} adopts a monoclinic crystal structure at room temperature and transitions to tetragonal and cubic at higher temperatures. The change of volume caused by the structure transitions from tetragonal to monoclinic to cubic induces large stresses, causing it to crack upon cooling from high temperatures. When the zirconia is blended with some other oxides, the tetragonal and/or cubic phases are stabilized. Effective dopants include magnesium oxide (MgO), yttrium oxide (Y_{2}O_{3}, yttria), calcium oxide (CaO), and cerium(III) oxide (Ce_{2}O_{3}).

Zirconia is often more useful in its phase 'stabilized' state. Upon heating, zirconia undergoes disruptive phase changes. By adding small percentages of yttria, these phase changes are eliminated, and the resulting material has superior thermal, mechanical, and electrical properties. In some cases, the tetragonal phase can be metastable. If sufficient quantities of the metastable tetragonal phase is present, then an applied stress, magnified by the stress concentration at a crack tip, can cause the tetragonal phase to convert to monoclinic, with the associated volume expansion. This phase transformation can then put the crack into compression, retarding its growth, and enhancing the fracture toughness. This mechanism, known as transformation toughening, significantly extends the reliability and lifetime of products made with stabilized zirconia.

The ZrO_{2} band gap is dependent on the phase (cubic, tetragonal, monoclinic, or amorphous) and preparation methods, with typical estimates from 5–7 eV.

A special case of zirconia is that of tetragonal zirconia polycrystal, or TZP, which is indicative of polycrystalline zirconia composed of only the metastable tetragonal phase.

== 3Y stabilised ZrO_{2} and 5Y stabilized ZrO_{2} ==
When ZrO_{2} is stabilized by adding 3 mol% of yttrium oxide (3Y-ZrO_{2}) at high temperatures (~1500 °C), its mechanical properties such as fracture toughness, flexural strength, and hardness are significantly improved. This is because 3Y-ZrO_{2} retains a metastable tetragonal phase at room temperature, which undergoes a stress-induced transformation to the monoclinic phase, leading to phase transformation toughening mechanism under high stress intensity.

In contrast, when ZrO_{2} is stabilized with 5 mol% of yttrium oxide (5Y-ZrO_{2}), it is primarily in the cubic phase, and does not undergo transformation toughening mechanism when stress is applied. As a result, while 5Y-ZrO₂ exhibits better optical properties, i.e., enhanced translucency due to fewer grain boundaries to scatter light, its mechanical properties (fracture toughness, strength, and hardness) do not improve in the same way as 3Y-ZrO₂.

== Uses ==
The main use of zirconia is in the production of hard ceramics, such as in dentistry, with other uses including as a protective coating on particles of titanium dioxide pigments, as a refractory material, in insulation, abrasives, and enamels.

Stabilized zirconia is used in oxygen sensors and fuel cell membranes because it has the ability to allow oxygen ions to move freely through the crystal structure at high temperatures. This high ionic conductivity (and a low electronic conductivity) makes it one of the most useful electroceramics. Zirconium dioxide is also used as the solid electrolyte in electrochromic devices.

Zirconia is a precursor to the electroceramic lead zirconate titanate (PZT), which is a high-κ dielectric, which is found in myriad components.

=== Niche uses ===
The very low thermal conductivity of cubic phase of zirconia also has led to its use as a thermal barrier coating, or TBC, in jet and diesel engines to allow operation at higher temperatures. Thermodynamically, the higher the operation temperature of an engine, the greater the possible efficiency. Another low-thermal-conductivity use is as a ceramic fiber insulation for crystal growth furnaces, fuel-cell stacks, and infrared heating systems.

This material is also used in dentistry in the manufacture of subframes for the construction of dental restorations such as crowns and bridges, which are then veneered with a conventional feldspathic porcelain for aesthetic reasons, or of strong, extremely durable dental prostheses constructed entirely from monolithic zirconia, with limited but constantly improving aesthetics. Zirconia stabilized with yttria (yttrium oxide), known as yttria-stabilized zirconia, can be used as a strong base material in some full ceramic crown restorations.

Transformation-toughened zirconia is used to make ceramic knives. Because of the hardness, ceramic-edged cutlery stays sharp longer than steel edged products.

Due to its infusibility and brilliant luminosity when incandescent, it was used as an ingredient of sticks for limelight. Zirconia was used as an alternative to limelight in zirconia lights.

Zirconia has been proposed to electrolyze carbon monoxide and oxygen from the atmosphere of Mars to provide both fuel and oxidizer that could be used as a store of chemical energy for use with surface transportation on Mars. Carbon monoxide/oxygen engines have been suggested for early surface transportation use, as both carbon monoxide and oxygen can be straightforwardly produced by zirconia electrolysis without requiring water to obtain hydrogen, needed for the production of methane or hydrogen-based fuels.

Zirconia is also used in the deposition of optical coatings. It is a high-index material usable from the near-UV to the mid-IR, due to its low absorption in this spectral region. In such applications, it is typically deposited by PVD.

In jewelry making, some watch cases are advertised as being "black zirconium oxide". In 2015 Omega released a fully ZrO_{2} watch named "The Dark Side of The Moon" with ceramic case, bezel, pushers, and clasp, advertising it as four times harder than stainless steel and therefore much more resistant to scratches during everyday use.

In gas tungsten arc welding, tungsten electrodes containing 1% zirconium oxide (zirconia) instead of 2% thorium have good arc starting and current capacity, and are not radioactive.

=== Research ===
Zirconia has been studied as a photocatalyst since its high band gap (~ 5 eV) allows the generation of high-energy electrons and holes. Some studies demonstrated the activity of doped zirconia (in order to increase visible light absorption) in degrading organic compounds and reducing Cr(VI) from wastewaters.

Zirconia is also a potential high-κ dielectric material with potential applications as an insulator in transistors.

In 2026, researchers demonstrated a printed ZrO^{2} fabric that exhibited passive cooling and some degree of electricity generation.

== Diamond simulant ==
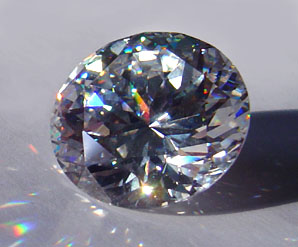
Brilliant-cut cubic zirconia

Single crystals of the cubic phase of zirconia are commonly used as diamond simulant in jewellery. Like diamond, cubic zirconia has a cubic crystal structure and a high index of refraction. Visually discerning a good quality cubic zirconia gem from a diamond is difficult, and most jewellers will have a thermal conductivity tester to identify cubic zirconia by its low thermal conductivity (diamond is a very good thermal conductor). This state of zirconia is commonly called cubic zirconia, CZ, or zircon by jewellers, but the last name is not chemically accurate. Zircon is actually the mineral name for naturally occurring zirconium(IV) silicate (ZrSiO_{4}).

== See also ==
- Quenching
- Sintering
- S-type star, emitting spectral lines of zirconium monoxide
- Yttria-stabilized zirconia
