= Diamond simulant =

Diamond-like object which is not a diamond

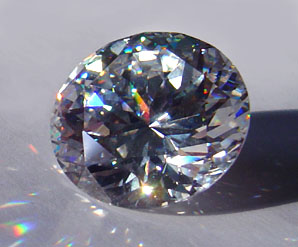
Its low cost and close visual likeness to diamond have made cubic zirconia the most gemologically and economically important diamond simulant since 1976.

A diamond simulant, diamond imitation or imitation diamond is an object or material with gemological characteristics similar to those of a diamond. Simulants are distinct from synthetic diamonds, which are actual diamonds exhibiting the same material properties as natural diamonds. Enhanced diamonds are also excluded from this definition. A diamond simulant may be artificial, natural, or in some cases a combination thereof. While their material properties depart markedly from those of diamond, simulants have certain desired characteristics—such as dispersion and hardness—which lend themselves to imitation. Trained gemologists with appropriate equipment are able to distinguish natural and synthetic diamonds from all diamond simulants, primarily by visual inspection.

The most common diamond simulants are high-leaded glass (i.e., rhinestones) and cubic zirconia (CZ), both artificial materials. A number of other artificial materials, such as strontium titanate and synthetic rutile have been developed since the mid-1950s, but these are no longer in common use. Introduced at the end of the 20th century, the lab-grown product moissanite has gained popularity as an alternative to diamond. The high price of gem-grade diamonds, as well as significant ethical concerns of the diamond trade, have created a large demand for diamond simulants.

== Desired and differential properties ==
In order to be considered for use as a diamond simulant, a material must possess certain diamond-like properties. The most advanced artificial simulants have properties which closely approach diamond, but all simulants have one or more features that clearly and (for those familiar with diamond) easily differentiate them from diamond. To a gemologist, the most important of differential properties are those that foster non-destructive testing; most of these are visual in nature. Non-destructive testing is preferred because most suspected diamonds are already cut into gemstones and set in jewelry, and if a destructive test (which mostly relies on the relative fragility and softness of non-diamonds) fails, it may damage the simulant—an unacceptable outcome for most jewelry owners, as even if a stone is not a diamond, it may still be of value.

Following are some of the properties by which diamond and its simulants can be compared and contrasted.

=== Durability and density ===
The Mohs scale of mineral hardness is a non-linear scale of common minerals' resistances to scratching. Diamond is at the top of this scale (hardness 10), as it is one of the hardest naturally occurring materials known. (Some artificial substances, such as aggregated diamond nanorods, are harder.) Since a diamond is unlikely to encounter substances that can scratch it, other than another diamond, diamond gemstones are typically free of scratches. Diamond's hardness also is visually evident (under the microscope or loupe) by its highly lustrous facets (described as adamantine) which are perfectly flat, and by its crisp, sharp facet edges. For a diamond simulant to be effective, it must be very hard relative to most gems. Most simulants fall far short of diamond's hardness, so they can be separated from diamond by their external flaws and poor polish.

In the recent past, the so-called "window pane test" was commonly thought to be an assured method of identifying diamond. It is a potentially destructive test wherein a suspect diamond gemstone is scraped against a pane of glass, with a positive result being a scratch on the glass and none on the gemstone. The use of hardness points and scratch plates made of corundum (hardness 9) are also used in place of glass. Hardness tests are inadvisable for three reasons: glass is fairly soft (typically 6 or below) and can be scratched by a large number of materials (including many simulants); diamond has four directions of perfect and easy cleavage (planes of structural weakness along which the diamond could split) which could be triggered by the testing process; and many diamond-like gemstones (including older simulants) are valuable in their own right.

The specific gravity (SG) or density of a gem diamond is fairly constant at 3.52. Most simulants are far above or slightly below this value, which can make them easy to identify if unset. High-density liquids such as diiodomethane can be used for this purpose, but these liquids are all highly toxic and therefore are usually avoided. A more practical method is to compare the expected size and weight of a suspect diamond to its measured parameters: for example, a cubic zirconia (SG 5.6–6) will be 1.7 times the expected weight of an equivalently sized diamond.

=== Optics and color ===
Diamonds are usually cut into brilliants to bring out their brilliance (the amount of light reflected back to the viewer) and fire (the degree to which colorful prismatic flashes are seen). Both properties are strongly affected by the cut of the stone, but they are a function of diamond's high refractive index (RI—the degree to which incident light is bent upon entering the stone) of 2.417 (as measured by sodium light, 589.3 nm) and high dispersion (the degree to which white light is split into its spectral colors as it passes through the stone) of 0.044, as measured by the sodium B and G line interval. Thus, if a diamond simulant's RI and dispersion are too low, it will appear comparatively dull or "lifeless"; if the RI and dispersion are too high, the effect will be considered unreal or even tacky. Very few simulants have closely approximating RI and dispersion, and even the close simulants can be separated by an experienced observer. Direct measurements of RI and dispersion are impractical (a standard gemological refractometer has an upper limit of about RI 1.81), but several companies have devised reflectivity meters to gauge a material's RI indirectly by measuring how well it reflects an infrared beam.

Perhaps equally important is optic character. Diamond and other cubic (and also amorphous) materials are isotropic, meaning that light entering a stone behaves the same way regardless of direction. Conversely, most minerals are anisotropic, which produces birefringence, or double refraction of light entering the material in all directions other than an optic axis (a direction of single refraction in a doubly refractive material). Under low magnification, this birefringence is usually detectable as a visual doubling of a cut gemstone's rear facets or internal flaws. An effective diamond simulant should therefore be isotropic.

Under longwave (365 nm) ultraviolet light, diamond may fluoresce a blue, yellow, green, mauve, or red of varying intensity. The most common fluorescence is blue, and such stones may also phosphoresce yellow—this is thought to be a unique combination among gemstones. There is usually little if any response to shortwave ultraviolet, in contrast to many diamond simulants. Similarly, because most diamond simulants are artificial, they tend to have uniform properties: in a multi-stone diamond ring, one would expect the individual diamonds to fluoresce differently (in different colors and intensities, with some likely to be inert). If all the stones fluoresce in an identical manner, they are unlikely to be mined diamonds (although this result can occur with synthetic diamonds).

Most "colorless" diamonds are actually tinted yellow or brown to some degree, whereas some artificial simulants are completely colorless—the equivalent of a perfect "D" in diamond color terminology. This "too good to be true" factor is important to consider; colored diamond simulants meant to imitate fancy diamonds are more difficult to spot in this regard, but the simulants' colors rarely approximate. In most diamonds (even colorless ones) a characteristic absorption spectrum can be seen (by a direct-vision spectroscope), consisting of a fine line at 415 nm. The dopants used to impart color in artificial simulants may be detectable as a complex rare-earth absorption spectrum, which is never seen in diamond.

Also present in most diamonds are certain internal and external flaws or inclusions, the most common of which are fractures and solid foreign crystals. Artificial simulants are usually internally flawless, and any flaws that are present are characteristic of the manufacturing process. The inclusions seen in natural simulants will often be unlike those ever seen in diamond, most notably liquid "feather" inclusions. The diamond cutting process will often leave portions of the original crystal's surface intact. These are termed naturals and are usually on the girdle of the stone; they take the form of triangular, rectangular, or square pits (etch marks) and are seen only in diamond.

=== Thermal and electrical ===
Diamond is an extremely effective thermal conductor and usually an electrical insulator. The former property is widely exploited in the use of an electronic thermal probe to separate diamonds from their imitations. These probes consist of a pair of battery-powered thermistors mounted in a fine copper tip. One thermistor functions as a heating device while the other measures the temperature of the copper tip: if the stone being tested is a diamond, it will conduct the tip's thermal energy rapidly enough to produce a measurable temperature drop. As most simulants are thermal insulators, the thermistor's heat will not be conducted. This test takes about 2–3 seconds. The only possible exception is moissanite, which has a thermal conductivity similar to diamond: older probes can be fooled by moissanite, but newer thermal and electrical conductivity testers are sophisticated enough to differentiate the two materials. The latest development is nano diamond coating, an extremely thin layer of diamond material. If not tested properly it may show the same characteristics as a diamond.

A diamond's electrical conductance is only relevant to blue or gray-blue stones, because the interstitial boron responsible for their color also makes them semiconductors. Thus, a suspected blue diamond can be affirmed if it completes an electric circuit successfully.

== Artificial simulants ==
Diamond has been imitated by artificial materials for hundreds of years; advances in technology have seen the development of increasingly better simulants with properties ever nearer those of diamond. Although most of these simulants were characteristic of a certain time period, their large production volumes ensured that all continue to be encountered with varying frequency in jewelry of the present. Nearly all were first conceived for intended use in high technology, such as active laser mediums, varistors, and bubble memory. Due to their limited present supply, collectors may pay a premium for the older types.

=== Summary table ===
Diamond simulants and their gemological properties
Material	Formula	Refractive index(es) 589.3 nm	Dispersion 431–687 nm	Hardness (Mohs' scale)	Density (g/cm^{3})	Thermal condc.	State of the art
Diamond	C	2.417	0.044	10	3.52	Excellent	
	Artificial simulants						
Flint glass	Silica with Pb, Al, Tl	~ 1.6	> 0.020	< 6	2.4–4.2	Poor	1700–
White sapphire	Al_{2}O_{3}	1.762–1.770	0.018	9	3.97	Poor	1900–1947
Spinel	MgO·Al_{2}O_{3}	1.727	0.020	8	~ 3.6	Poor	1920–1947
Rutile	TiO_{2}	2.62–2.9	0.33	~ 6	4.25	Poor	1947–1955
Strontium titanate	SrTiO_{3}	2.41	0.19	5.5	5.13	Poor	1955–1970
YAG	Y_{3}Al_{5}O_{12}	1.83	0.028	8.25	4.55–4.65	Poor	1970–1975
GGG	Gd_{3}Ga_{5}O_{12}	1.97	0.045	7	7.02	Poor	1973–1975
Cubic zirconia	ZrO_{2} (+ rare earths)	~ 2.2	~ 0.06	~ 8.3	~ 5.7	Poor	1976–
Moissanite	SiC	2.648–2.691	0.104	8.5–9.25	3.2	High	1998–
	Natural simulants						
Quartz	Silica	1.543–1.554		7	2.50–2.65		Ancient
Andradite	Ca_{3}Fe_{2}(SiO_{4})_{3}	1.61–1.64	0.057	6.5–7	3.8–3.9	Poor	Ancient
Zircon	ZrSiO_{4}	1.78–1.99	0.039	6.5–7.5	4.6–4.7	Poor	Ancient
Topaz	Al_{2}SiO_{4}(F, OH)_{2}	1.61–1.64	0.014	8	3.4–3.6	Poor	Ancient

The "refractive index(es)" column shows one refractive index for singly refractive substances, and a range for doubly refractive substances.

=== 1700 onwards ===
The formulation of flint glass using lead, alumina, and thallium to increase RI and dispersion began in the late Baroque period. Flint glass is fashioned into brilliants, and when freshly cut they can be surprisingly effective diamond simulants. Known as rhinestones, pastes, or strass, glass simulants are a common feature of antique jewelry; in such cases, rhinestones can be valuable historical artifacts in their own right. The great softness (below hardness 6) imparted by the lead means a rhinestone's facet edges and faces will quickly become rounded and scratched. Together with conchoidal fractures, and air bubbles or flow lines within the stone, these features make glass imitations easy to spot under only moderate magnification. In contemporary production it is more common for glass to be molded rather than cut into shape: in these stones the facets will be concave and facet edges rounded, and mold marks or seams may also be present. Glass has also been combined with other materials to produce composites.

=== 1900–1947 ===
The first crystalline artificial diamond simulants were synthetic white sapphire (Al_{2}O_{3}, pure corundum) and spinel (MgO·Al_{2}O_{3}, pure magnesium aluminium oxide). Both have been synthesized in large quantities since the first decade of the 20th century via the Verneuil or flame-fusion process, although spinel was not in wide use until the 1920s. The Verneuil process involves an inverted oxyhydrogen blowpipe, with purified feed powder mixed with oxygen that is carefully fed through the blowpipe. The feed powder falls through the oxy-hydrogen flame, melts, and lands on a rotating and slowly descending pedestal below. The height of the pedestal is constantly adjusted to keep its top at the optimal position below the flame, and over a number of hours the molten powder cools and crystallizes to form a single pedunculated pear or boule crystal. The process is an economical one, with crystals of up to 9 centimeters (3.5 inches) in diameter grown. Boules grown via the modern Czochralski process may weigh several kilograms.

Synthetic sapphire and spinel are durable materials (hardness 9 and 8) that take a good polish; however, due to their much lower RI when compared to diamond (1.762–1.770 for sapphire, 1.727 for spinel), they are "lifeless" when cut. (Synthetic sapphire is also anisotropic, making it even easier to spot.) Their low RIs also mean a much lower dispersion (0.018 and 0.020), so even when cut into brilliants they lack the fire of diamond. Nevertheless, synthetic spinel and sapphire were popular diamond simulants from the 1920s until the late 1940s, when newer and better simulants began to appear. Both have also been combined with other materials to create composites. Commercial names once used for synthetic sapphire include Diamondette, Diamondite, Jourado Diamond', and Thrilliant. Names for synthetic spinel included Corundolite, Lustergem, Magalux, and Radiant.

=== 1947–1970 ===
The first of the optically "improved" simulants was synthetic rutile (TiO_{2}, pure titanium oxide). Introduced in 1947–48, synthetic rutile possesses plenty of life when cut—perhaps too much life for a diamond simulant. Synthetic rutile's RI and dispersion (2.8 and 0.33) are so much higher than diamond that the resultant brilliants look almost opal-like in their display of prismatic colors. Synthetic rutile is also doubly refractive: although some stones are cut with the table perpendicular to the optic axis to hide this property, merely tilting the stone will reveal the doubled back facets.

The continued success of synthetic rutile was also hampered by the material's inescapable yellow tint, which producers were never able to remedy. However, synthetic rutile in a range of different colors, including blues and reds, were produced using various metal oxide dopants. These and the near-white stones were extremely popular if unreal stones. Synthetic rutile is also fairly soft (hardness ~6) and brittle, and therefore wears poorly. It is synthesized via a modification of the Verneuil process, which uses a third oxygen pipe to create a tricone burner; this is necessary to produce a single crystal, due to the much higher oxygen losses involved in the oxidation of titanium. The technique was invented by Charles H. Moore, Jr. at the South Amboy, New Jersey–based National Lead Company (later NL Industries). National Lead and Union Carbide were the primary producers of synthetic rutile, and peak annual production reached 750,000 carats (150 kg). Some of the many commercial names applied to synthetic rutile include: Astryl, Diamothyst, Gava or Java Gem, Meredith, Miridis, Rainbow Diamond, Rainbow Magic Diamond, Rutania, Titangem, Titania, and Ultamite.

National Lead was also where research into the synthesis of another titanium compound—strontium titanate (SrTiO_{3}, pure tausonite)—was conducted. Research was done during the late 1940s and early 1950s by Leon Merker and Langtry E. Lynd, who also used a tricone modification of the Verneuil process. Upon its commercial introduction in 1955, strontium titanate quickly replaced synthetic rutile as the most popular diamond simulant. This was due not only to strontium titanate's novelty, but to its superior optics: its RI (2.41) is very close to that of diamond, while its dispersion (0.19), although also very high, was a significant improvement over synthetic rutile's psychedelic display. Dopants were also used to give synthetic titanate a variety of colors, including yellow, orange to red, blue, and black. The material is also isotropic like diamond, meaning there is no distracting doubling of facets as seen in synthetic rutile.

Strontium titanate's only major drawback (if one excludes excess fire) is fragility. It is both softer (hardness 5.5) and more brittle than synthetic rutile—for this reason, strontium titanate was also combined with more durable materials to create composites. It was otherwise the best simulant around at the time, and at its peak annual production was 1.5 million carats (300 kg). Due to patent coverage, all US production was by National Lead, while large amounts were produced overseas by Nakazumi Company of Japan. Commercial names for strontium titanate included Brilliante, Diagem, Diamontina, Fabulite, and Marvelite.

=== 1970–1976 ===
From about 1970 strontium titanate began to be replaced by a new class of diamond imitations: the "synthetic garnets". These are not true garnets in the usual sense because they are oxides rather than silicates, but they do share natural garnet's crystal structure (both are cubic and therefore isotropic) and the general formula A_{3}B_{2}C_{3}O_{12}. While in natural garnets C is always silicon, and A and B may be one of several common elements, most synthetic garnets are composed of uncommon rare-earth elements. They are the only diamond simulants (aside from rhinestones) with no known natural counterparts: gemologically they are best termed artificial rather than synthetic, because the latter term is reserved for human-made materials that can also be found in nature.

Although a number of artificial garnets were successfully grown, only two became important as diamond simulants. The first was yttrium aluminium garnet (YAG; Y_{3}Al_{5}O_{12}) in the late 1960s. It was (and still is) produced by the Czochralski, or crystal-pulling, process, which involves growth from the melt. An iridium crucible surrounded by an inert atmosphere is used, wherein yttrium oxide and aluminium oxide are melted and mixed together at a carefully controlled temperature near 1980 °C. A small seed crystal is attached to a rod, which is lowered over the crucible until the crystal contacts the surface of the melted mixture. The seed crystal acts as a site of nucleation; the temperature is kept steady at a point where the surface of the mixture is just below the melting point. The rod is slowly and continuously rotated and retracted, and the pulled mixture crystallizes as it exits the crucible, forming a single crystal in the form of a cylindrical boule. The crystal's purity is extremely high, and it typically measures 5 cm (2 inches) in diameter and 20 cm (8 inches) in length, and weighs 9,000 carats (1.75 kg).

YAG hardness (8.25) and lack of brittleness were great improvements over strontium titanate, and although its RI (1.83) and dispersion (0.028) were fairly low, they were enough to give brilliant-cut YAGs perceptible fire and good brilliance (although still much lower than diamond). A number of different colors were also produced with the addition of dopants, including yellow, red, and a vivid green, which was used to imitate emerald. Major producers included Shelby Gem Factory of Michigan, Litton Systems, Allied Chemical, Raytheon, and Union Carbide; annual global production peaked at 40 million carats (8000 kg) in 1972, but fell sharply thereafter. Commercial names for YAG included Diamonair, Diamonique, Gemonair, Replique, and Triamond.

While market saturation was one reason for the fall in YAG production levels, another was the recent introduction of the other artificial garnet important as a diamond simulant, gadolinium gallium garnet (GGG; Gd_{3}Ga_{5}O_{12}). Produced in much the same manner as YAG (but with a lower melting point of 1750 °C), GGG had an RI (1.97) close to, and a dispersion (0.045) nearly identical to diamond. GGG was also hard enough (hardness 7) and tough enough to be an effective gemstone, but its ingredients were also much more expensive than YAG's. Equally hindering was GGG's tendency to turn dark brown upon exposure to sunlight or other ultraviolet source: this was due to the fact that most GGG gems were fashioned from impure material that was rejected for technological use. The SG of GGG (7.02) is also the highest of all diamond simulants and amongst the highest of all gemstones, which makes loose GGG gems easy to spot by comparing their dimensions with their expected and actual weights. Relative to its predecessors, GGG was never produced in significant quantities; it became more or less unheard of by the close of the 1970s. Commercial names for GGG included Diamonique II and Galliant.

=== Since 1976 ===
Cubic zirconia or CZ (ZrO_{2}; zirconium dioxide—not to be confused with zircon, a zirconium silicate) quickly dominated the diamond simulant market following its introduction in 1976, and it remains the most gemologically and economically important simulant. CZ had been synthesized since 1930 but only in ceramic form: the growth of single-crystal CZ would require an approach radically different from those used for previous simulants due to zirconia's extremely high melting point (2750 °C), unsustainable by any crucible. The solution found involved a network of water-filled copper pipes and radio-frequency induction heating coils; the latter to heat the zirconia feed powder, and the former to cool the exterior and maintain a retaining "skin" under 1 millimeter thick. CZ was thus grown in a crucible of itself, a technique called cold crucible (in reference to the cooling pipes) or skull crucible (in reference to either the shape of the crucible or of the crystals grown).

At standard pressure zirconium oxide would normally crystallize in the monoclinic rather than cubic crystal system: for cubic crystals to grow, a stabilizer must be used. This is usually Yttrium(III) oxide or calcium oxide. The skull crucible technique was first developed in 1960s France, but was perfected in the early 1970s by Soviet scientists under V. V. Osiko at the Lebedev Physical Institute in Moscow. By 1980 annual global production had reached 50 million carats (10,000 kg).

The hardness (8–8.5), RI (2.15–2.18, isotropic), dispersion (0.058–0.066), and low material cost make CZ the most popular simulant of diamond. Its optical and physical constants are however variable, owing to the different stabilizers used by different producers. There are many formulations of stabilized cubic zirconia. These variations change the physical and optical properties markedly. While the visual likeness of CZ is close enough to diamond to fool most who do not handle diamond regularly, CZ will usually give certain clues. For example: it is somewhat brittle and is soft enough to possess scratches after normal use in jewelry; it is usually internally flawless and completely colorless (whereas most diamonds have some internal imperfections and a yellow tint); its SG (5.6–6) is high; and its reaction under ultraviolet light is a distinctive beige. Most jewelers will use a thermal probe to test all suspected CZs, a test which relies on diamond's superlative thermal conductivity (CZ, like almost all other diamond simulants, is a thermal insulator). CZ is made in a number of different colors meant to imitate fancy diamonds (e.g., yellow to golden brown, orange, red to pink, green, and opaque black), but most of these do not approximate the real thing. Cubic zirconia can be coated with diamond-like carbon to improve its durability, but will still be detected as CZ by a thermal probe.

CZ had virtually no competition until the 1998 introduction of moissanite (SiC; silicon carbide). Moissanite is superior to cubic zirconia in three ways: its hardness (8.5–9.25); low specific gravity (3.2); refractive index of 2.65, the highest known. The former property results in facets that are sometimes as crisp as a diamond's, while the latter property makes simulated moissanite somewhat harder to spot when unset (although still disparate enough to detect). However, unlike diamond and cubic zirconia, moissanite is strongly birefringent. This manifests as the same "drunken vision" effect seen in synthetic rutile, although to a lesser degree. All moissanite is cut with the table perpendicular to the optic axis in order to hide this property from above, but when viewed under magnification at only a slight tilt the doubling of facets (and any inclusions) is readily apparent.

The inclusions seen in moissanite are also characteristic: most will have fine, white, subparallel growth tubes or needles oriented perpendicular to the stone's table. It is conceivable that these growth tubes could be mistaken for laser drill holes that are sometimes seen in diamond (see diamond enhancement), but the tubes will be noticeably doubled in moissanite due to its birefringence. Like synthetic rutile, current moissanite production is also plagued by an as yet inescapable tint, which is usually a brownish green. A limited range of fancy colors have been produced as well, the two most common being blue and green.

== Natural simulants ==
Natural minerals that (when cut) optically resemble white diamonds are rare, because the trace impurities usually present in natural minerals tend to impart color. The earliest simulants of diamond were colorless quartz (A form of silica, which also form obsidian, glass and sand), rock crystal (a type of quartz), topaz, and beryl (goshenite); they are all common minerals with above-average hardness (7–8), but all have low RIs and correspondingly low dispersions. Well-formed quartz crystals are sometimes offered as "diamonds", a popular example being the so-called "Herkimer diamonds" mined in Herkimer County, New York. Topaz's SG (3.50–3.57) also falls within the range of diamond.

From a historical perspective, the most notable natural simulant of diamond is zircon. It is also fairly hard (7.5), but more importantly shows perceptible fire when cut, due to its high dispersion of 0.039. Colorless zircon has been mined in Sri Lanka for over 2,000 years; prior to the advent of modern mineralogy, colorless zircon was thought to be an inferior form of diamond. It was called "Matara diamond" after its source location. It is still encountered as a diamond simulant, but differentiation is easy due to zircon's anisotropy and strong birefringence (0.059). It is also notoriously brittle and often shows wear on the girdle and facet edges.

Much less common than colorless zircon is colorless scheelite. Its dispersion (0.026) is also high enough to mimic diamond, but although it is highly lustrous its hardness is much too low (4.5–5.5) to maintain a good polish. It is also anisotropic and fairly dense (SG 5.9–6.1). Synthetic scheelite produced via the Czochralski process is available, but it has never been widely used as a diamond simulant. Due to the scarcity of natural gem-quality scheelite, synthetic scheelite is much more likely to simulate it than diamond. A similar case is the orthorhombic carbonate cerussite, which is so fragile (very brittle with four directions of good cleavage) and soft (hardness 3.5) that it is never seen set in jewelry, and only occasionally seen in gem collections because it is so difficult to cut. Cerussite gems have an adamantine luster, high RI (1.804–2.078), and high dispersion (0.051), making them attractive and valued collector's pieces. Aside from softness, they are easily distinguished by cerussite's high density (SG 6.51) and anisotropy with extreme birefringence (0.271).

Due to their rarity fancy-colored diamonds are also imitated, and zircon can serve this purpose too. Applying heat treatment to brown zircon can create several bright colors: these are most commonly sky-blue, golden yellow, and red. Blue zircon is very popular, but it is not necessarily color stable; prolonged exposure to ultraviolet light (including the UV component in sunlight) tends to bleach the stone. Heat treatment also imparts greater brittleness to zircon and characteristic inclusions.

Another fragile candidate mineral is sphalerite (zinc blende). Gem-quality material is usually a strong yellow to honey brown, orange, red, or green; its very high RI (2.37) and dispersion (0.156) make for an extremely lustrous and fiery gem, and it is also isotropic. But here again, its low hardness (2.5–4) and perfect dodecahedral cleavage preclude sphalerite's wide use in jewelry. Two calcium-rich members of the garnet group fare much better: these are grossularite (usually brownish orange, rarely colorless, yellow, green, or pink) and andradite. The latter is the rarest and most costly of the garnets, with three of its varieties—topazolite (yellow), melanite (black), and demantoid (green)—sometimes seen in jewelry. Demantoid (literally "diamond-like") especially has been prized as a gemstone since its discovery in the Ural Mountains in 1868; it is a noted feature of antique Russian and Art Nouveau jewelry. Titanite or sphene is also seen in antique jewelry; it is typically some shade of chartreuse and has a luster, RI (1.885–2.050), and dispersion (0.051) high enough to be mistaken for diamond, yet it is anisotropic (a high birefringence of 0.105–0.135) and soft (hardness 5.5).

Discovered the 1960s, the rich green tsavorite variety of grossular is also very popular. Both grossular and andradite are isotropic and have relatively high RIs (around 1.74 and 1.89 respectively) and high dispersions (0.027 and 0.057), with demantoid's exceeding diamond. However, both have a low hardness (6.5–7.5) and invariably possess inclusions atypical for diamond—the byssolite "horsetails" seen in demantoid are one striking example. Furthermore, most are very small, typically under 0.5 carats (100 mg) in weight. Their lusters range from vitreous to subadamantine, to almost metallic in the usually opaque melanite, which has been used to simulate black diamond. Some natural spinel is also deep black and could serve this same purpose.

== Composites ==
Because strontium titanate and glass are too soft to survive use as a ring stone, they have been used in the construction of composite or doublet diamond simulants. The two materials are used for the bottom portion (pavilion) of the stone, and in the case of strontium titanate, a much harder material—usually colorless synthetic spinel or sapphire—is used for the top half (crown). In glass doublets, the top portion is made of almandine garnet; it is usually a very thin slice which does not modify the stone's overall body color. There have even been reports of diamond-on-diamond doublets, where a creative entrepreneur has used two small pieces of rough to create one larger stone.

In strontium titanate and diamond-based doublets, an epoxy is used to adhere the two halves together. The epoxy may fluoresce under UV light, and there may be residue on the stone's exterior. The garnet top of a glass doublet is physically fused to its base, but in it and the other doublet types there are usually flattened air bubbles seen at the junction of the two halves. A join line is also readily visible whose position is variable; it may be above or below the girdle, sometimes at an angle, but rarely along the girdle itself.

The most recent composite simulant involves combining a CZ core with an outer coating of laboratory created amorphous diamond. The concept effectively mimics the structure of a cultured pearl (which combines a core bead with an outer layer of pearl coating), only done for the diamond market.

== See also ==
- Diamond clarity
- Diamond cut
- Memorial diamond
- Fullerene
- Imitation pearl
