= Ceramic knife =

Knife with a blade made out of non-metallic material

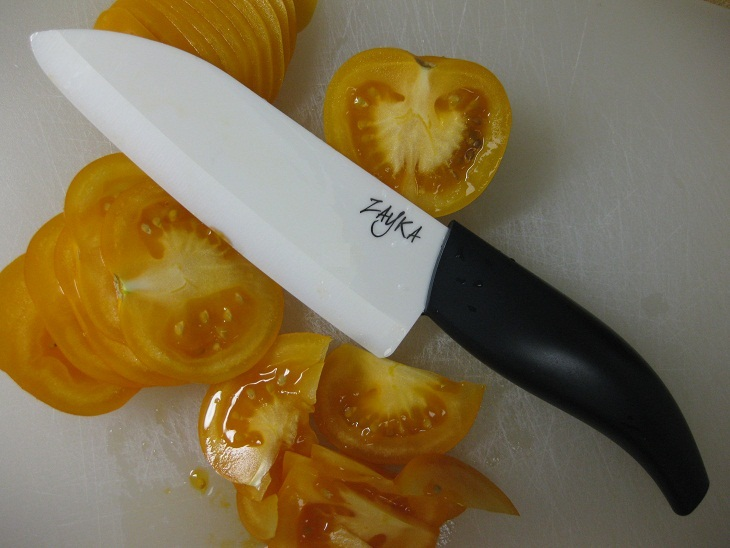
A ceramic knife.

A ceramic knife is a knife with a ceramic blade typically made from zirconium dioxide (ZrO_{2}; also known as zirconia), rather than the steel used for most knives. Ceramic knife blades are usually produced through the dry-pressing and firing of powdered zirconia using solid-state sintering. The blades typically score 8.5 on the Mohs scale of mineral hardness, compared to 4.5 for normal steel and 7.5 to 8 for hardened steel and 10 for diamond. The resultant blade has a hard edge that stays sharp for much longer than conventional steel blades. However, the blade is brittle, subject to chipping, and will break rather than flex if twisted. The ceramic blade is sharpened by grinding the edges with a diamond-dust-coated grinding wheel.

== Zirconium oxide ==
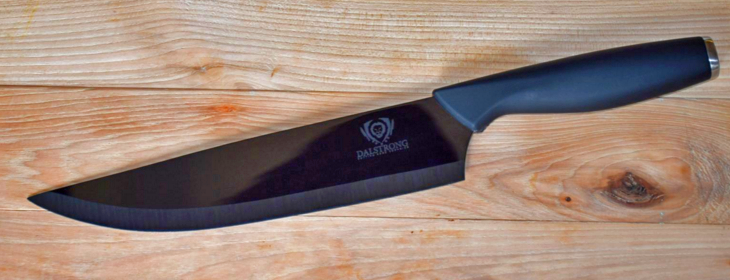
A ceramic knife made from blackened zirconia, super heated under pressure.

Zirconium oxide is used due to the fact it exists in several different forms. Zirconium can be monoclinic, tetragonal or cubic in form. Cooling to the monoclinic phase after sintering causes a large volume change, which often causes stress fractures in pure zirconia. Additives such as magnesia, calcia and yttria are used in manufacturing the knife material to stabilize the high-temperature phases and minimize this volume change. The highest strength and toughness is produced by the addition of 3 mol% yttrium oxide yielding partially stabilized zirconia. This material consists of a mixture of tetragonal and cubic phases with a bending strength of nearly 1,200 MPa (170,000 psi). Small cracks allow phase transformations to occur, which essentially close the cracks and prevent catastrophic failure, resulting in a relatively tough ceramic material, sometimes known as TTZ (transformation-toughened zirconia).

== Properties ==
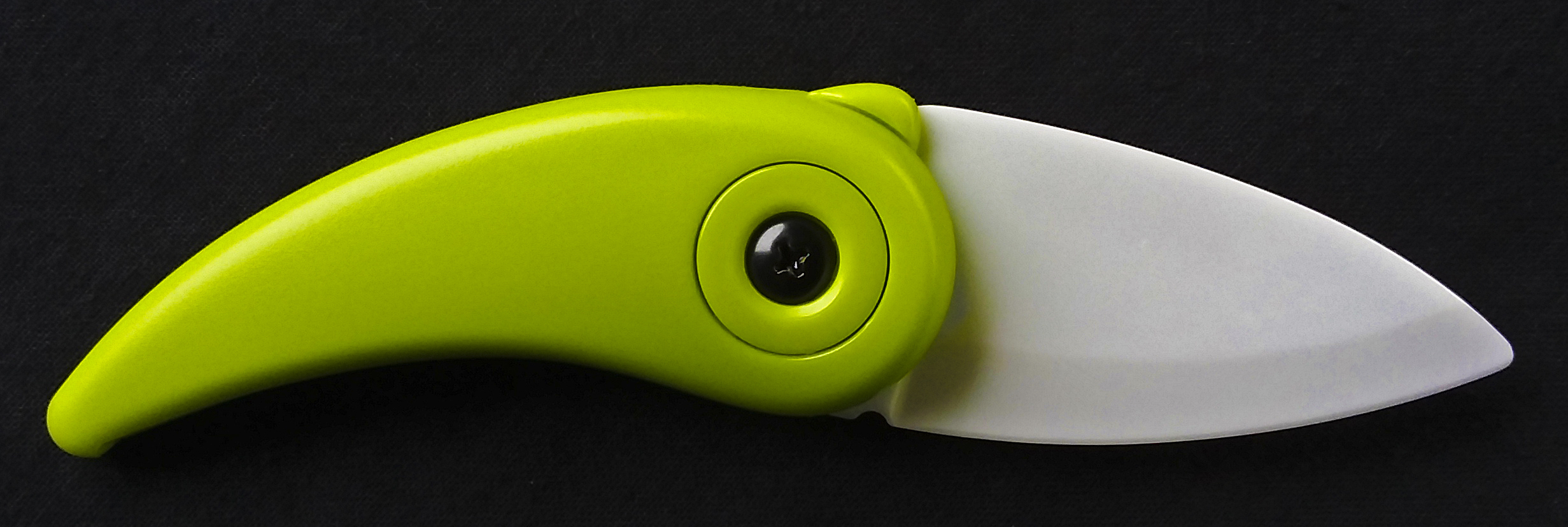
Special ceramic jackknife

Ceramic knives are substantially harder than steel knives, will not corrode in harsh environments, are non-magnetic, and do not conduct electricity at room temperature. Because of their resistance to strong acid and caustic substances, and their ability to retain a cutting edge longer than steel knives, ceramic knives are suitable for slicing boneless meat, vegetables, fruit and bread. Since ceramics are brittle, blades may break if dropped on a hard surface, although improved manufacturing processes have reduced this risk. They are also unsuitable for chopping through hard foods such as bones or frozen foods, and for applications which require prying, which may cause breaking or chipping. Several brands offer either a black-coloured or a designed blade made through an additional hot isostatic pressing step, which increases toughness.

== Sharpening and general care ==
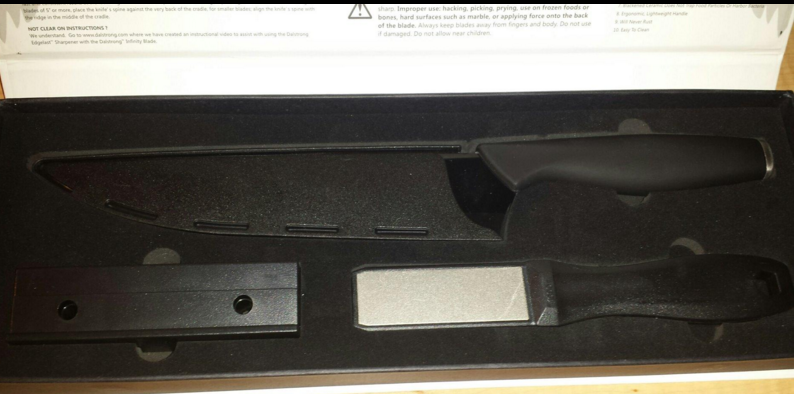
A diamond dust sharpener with cradle for a ceramic knife.

The hardness of the ceramic material makes it difficult to resharpen. Consequently, although a ceramic knife does not need regular sharpening in the same way as steel, when its blade eventually becomes blunt or chipped, specialized sharpening services are required for the ceramic edge.
