= Tetragonal polycrystalline zirconia =

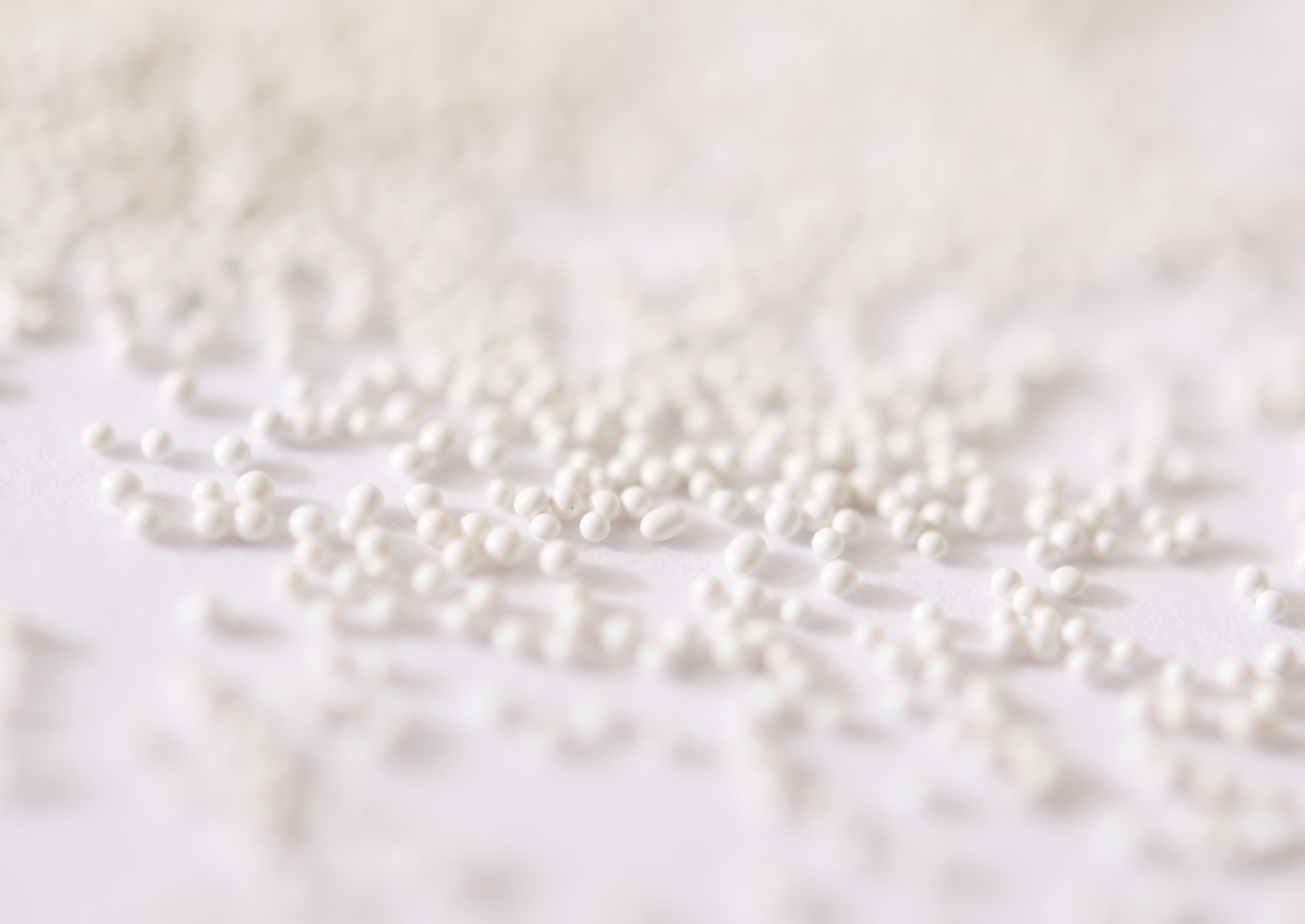
Zirconia/silica beads for cell disruption.

Yttria blends of approximately 3% are called either tetragonal polycrystalline zirconia or tetragonal zirconia polycrystal (forming the initialisms TZP or TPZ) and have the finest grain size. These grades exhibit the highest toughness at room temperature, because they are nearly 100% tetragonal, but this degrades severely between 200 and 500 °C as these irreversible crystal transformations also cause dimensional change.

== See also ==
- Zirconium dioxide
