= Zinc titanate =

Names
- Other names Zinc titanium oxide

Identifiers
CAS Number	12036-43-0
3D model (JSmol)	Interactive image
ChemSpider	21241757
EC Number	234-850-0
PubChem CID	56846072
UNII	Q7BZ613DTN
CompTox Dashboard (EPA)	DTXSID90923355
- InChI: InChI=1S/3O.Ti.Zn/q;2*-1;;+2 Key: DJSKLKQRHSKRDZ-UHFFFAOYSA-N
- SMILES: [O-][Ti](=O)[O-].[Zn+2]

Properties
Chemical formula	ZnTiO_{3}
Molar mass	161.24 g/mol
Appearance	White powder
Solubility in water	Insoluble

Hazards
- GHS labelling
Pictograms	(GHS07: Exclamation mark)
Signal word	Warning
Hazard statements	H302, H331
Precautionary statements	P260
NFPA 704 (fire diamond)	1 0 0
Flash point	None
- Except where otherwise noted, data are given for materials in their standard state (at 25 °C [77 °F], 100 kPa). verify (what is ?) Infobox references

Zinc titanate, also known as zinc titanium oxide, is an inorganic compound existing in three major forms: ZnTiO_{3} (ZnO-TiO_{2}), Zn_{2}TiO_{4} (2ZnO-TiO_{2}) and Zn_{2}Ti_{3}O_{8} (2ZnO-3TiO_{2}). It is used as a regenerable catalyst, a pigment and a sorbent of sulfur compounds at elevated temperatures. It is a white powder that is insoluble in water.

== Synthesis and properties ==
The ZnTiO_{3}, Zn_{2}TiO_{4} and Zn_{2}Ti_{3}O_{8} forms crystallize in hexagonal, cubic (inverse spinel) and cubic structures, respectively. They can be produced by heating a mixture of ZnO and TiO_{2} powders or processing it with a ball mill. Zn_{2}Ti_{3}O_{8} forms at lowest temperatures, followed by ZnTiO_{3} and then Zn_{2}TiO_{4}; the last phase dominates at temperatures above 1000 °C.
