= Genoa Joint Laboratories =

Italian research initiative

Genoa Joint Laboratories (GJL) is a scientific research initiative established in 2002 that brings together expertise in electroceramics and electrochemistry. It is a collaborative effort among three Genoa-based institutions: National Research Council - Institute for Energetics and Interphases (CNR-IENI), Department of Chemical and Process Engineering with University of Genova (DICHeP), and the Department of Chemistry and Industrial Chemistry (DCCI) at the University of Genova.

== Research focus ==
The focus of GJL's research is across four fundamental factors that are critical to production and implementation of High-Temperature Solid Oxide Fuel Cells:

- Synthesis and sintering of electrolytes
- Cell design, testing and analysis
- Electrocatalysis
- Interconnects

Bridging these four factors, GJL is engaged in research in six interdependent fields:

- Synthesis of cathode and anode materials for IT-SOFCs
- Synthesis of protonic electrolyte for IT/LT-SOFCs
- Production of engineered electrodes
- Electrochemical kinetics at the anode and cathode for SOFCs and MCFCs
- Study of metallic interconnect behaviour
- Model the distribution of active sites in composite electrodes

Using Electrochemical Impedance Spectroscopy, it has been found that the rate determining step of the oxygen reduction reaction changes between 700 and 800 °C. This is important because it proves the existence of a critical temperature, previously only theorised, for activation of the entire composite cathode volume close to 750 °C. Below this temperature, ionic transport is slower; as the temperature increases, so does ionic activity through the cathode. Additionally, GJL researchers have demonstrated that the volume ratio between Lanthanum Strontium Manganite (LSM) and Yttria Stabilised Zirconia (YSZ) composite cathodes which is close to 1:1 gives the best electrochemical activity because of the extension of the three phase boundary (TPB) in the electrode. By means of impedance analysis and potentiodynamic polarisation, this finding has strong implications for optimal SOFC design.

== Affiliated research facilities ==
- National Research Council - Institute for Energetics and Interphases (CNR-IENI)

(Italian: Consiglio Nazionale delle Ricerche, Istituto per l'Energetica e le Interfasi)

- Department of Chemical and Process Engineering – University of Genova (DICHeP)
  (Italian: Dipartimento di Ingegneria Chimica e di Processo)

The principal element within DICHeP participating is the Electrochemistry Lab .

- Department of Chemistry and Industrial Chemistry – University of Genova (DCCI)

(Italian: Dipartimento di Chimica e Chimica Industriale)
