= Shelby Gem Factory =

American artificial gemstone manufacturer

ICT Incorporated
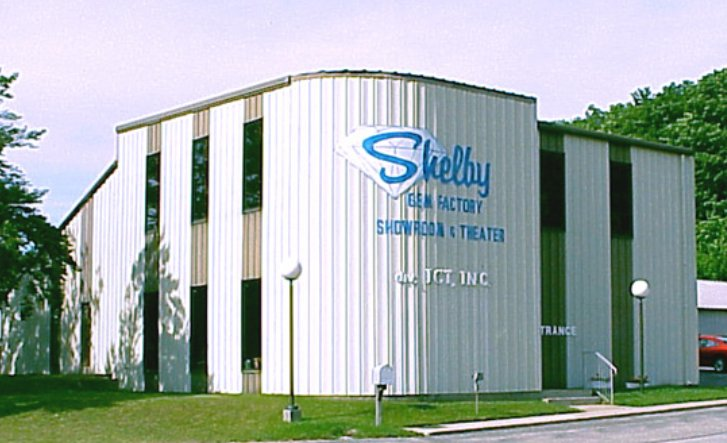
- Shelby Gem Factory
- Trade name: Shelby Gem Factory
- Company type: Private
- Founded: 1970; 55 years ago
- Founders: Larry Paul Kelley; Craig Hardy
- Defunct: 2019
- Headquarters: Shelby, Michigan, United States
- Owners: Larry Paul Kelley; Jo Kelley
- Website: shelbygemfactory.com

The Shelby Gem Factory was the production facility of ICT Incorporated, a company in Shelby, Michigan, United States, that manufactured artificial gemstones through proprietary processes. ICT began operations in 1970 and closed in December 2019.

== History ==
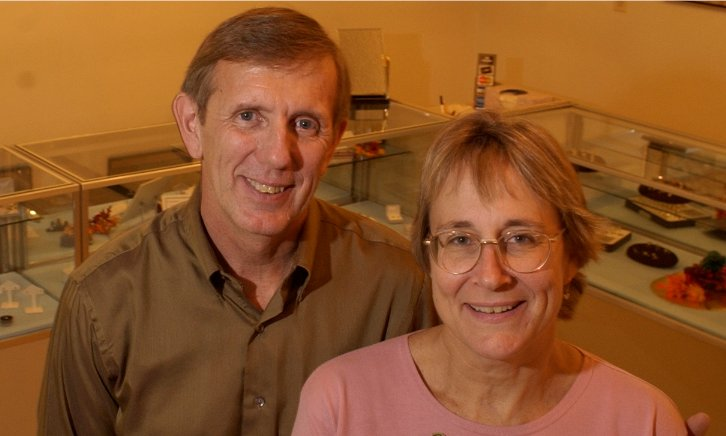
Larry Paul Kelley and wife Jo Kelley, owners of the Shelby Gem Factory

Larry Paul Kelley established ICT (International Crystal Technology) in 1970 with Craig Hardy and Tom VanBergen. Kelley had worked for Dow Chemical in Ludington and at a factory in Ann Arbor that produced laser crystals. The facility was sited in Shelby because the town had a new industrial park. By 2015, Kelley was ICT's sole owner.

The Shelby Gem Factory initially produced only synthetic ruby, with ruby lasers being the principal application, primarily sold to firms in California. However, laser technology was in its infancy, and the far greater profit potential of converting ruby rods into a variety of artificial gemstones of various colors led to a change in the factory's focus. Larry Kelley built on Soviet research into cubic zirconia and became its first commercial producer, having solved issues of temperature control that had impeded its production. For a time, cubic zirconia was a lucrative product line; Shelby opened factories outside the United States to keep up with demand. However, the value of cubic zirconia soon declined to the point that it was used as fill when the factory was expanded. In 1983, ICT opened a faceting factory in southern China to create gemstones for jewelry use from the crystals produced in Shelby; this closed in 1991, and separate companies in China and South Korea were contracted to continue faceting. The South Korean market represented up to 40 percent of the factory's sales until a precipitous decline caused by the 1997 Asian financial crisis. In 1994, the factory entered the business of recrystallizing rubies, buying low-grade gems from Myanmar to be melted down in the process.

A 50-seat theater ran a presentation for visitors, and jewelry was sold on site.

The factory closed in 2019 after Kelley was diagnosed in 2017 with Alzheimer's disease. Other issues that contributed to the closing were worldwide competition and online markets. Larry Kelley died on October 24, 2020.

== Manufacturing ==
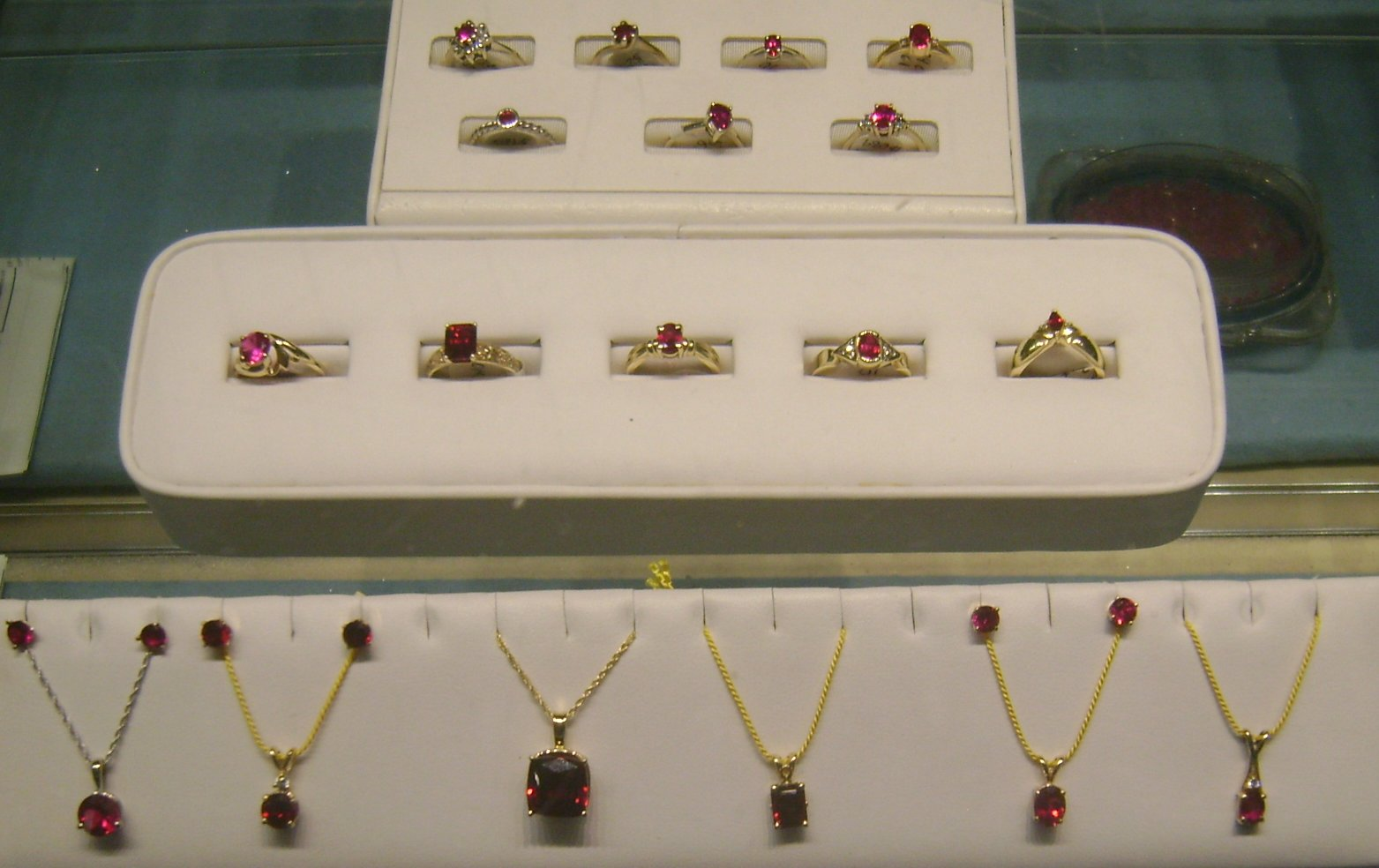
Shelby Gem Factory jewelry of man-made synthetic rubies

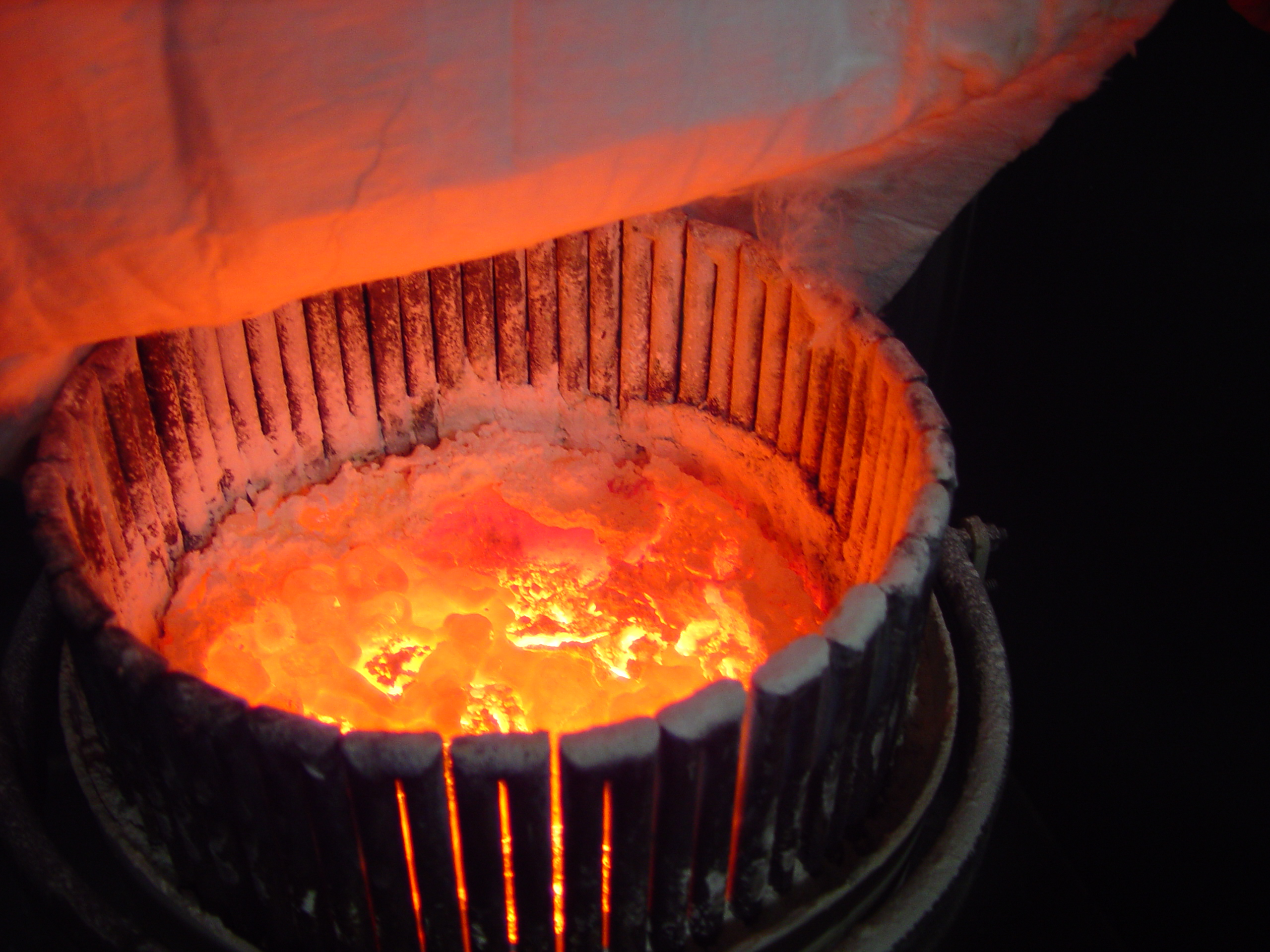
A cubic zirconia gem-making furnace

Some of the furnaces burned at 5,040 °F (2,780 °C). Factory tours were discontinued due to liability concerns attendant to the "very high temperatures and extremely bright light" and the unavailability of affordable insurance to cover the risk.

The gems were synthesized in a furnace. The Shelby Gem Factory's diamonds were simulants. The factory also manufactured simulated citrine and topaz, along with other birthstone substitutes.

== See also ==
- Czochralski method
- Skull crucible
