= Baddeleyite =

Zirconium oxide mineral

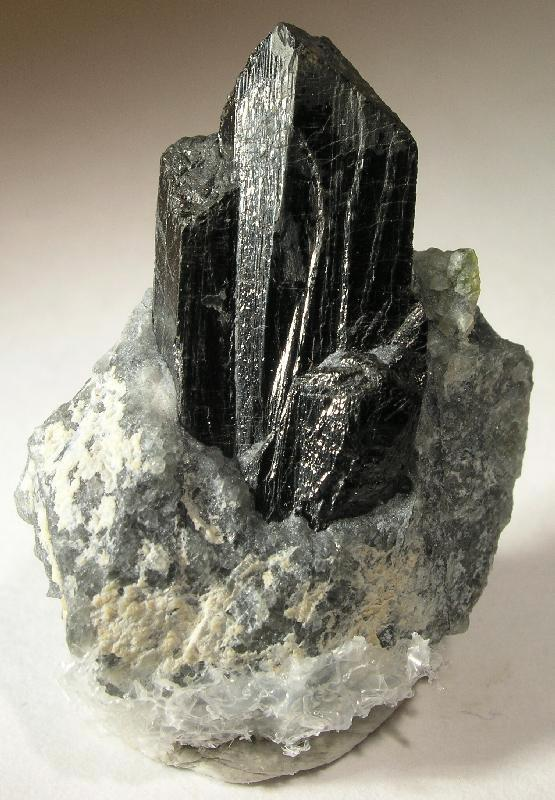
- Baddeleyite from Phalaborwa, South Africa

General
- Category: Oxide mineral
- Formula: Zirconium dioxide (ZrO_{2})
- IMA symbol: Bdy
- Strunz classification: 4.DE.35
- Dana classification: 04.04.14.01
- Crystal system: Monoclinic
- Crystal class: Prismatic (2/m) (same H-M symbol)
- Space group: P2_{1}/c
- Unit cell: a = 5.1505 Å, b = 5.2116 Å, c = 5.3173 Å, β = 99.23°; Z = 4

Identification
- Color: Colorless to yellow, blue, green, greenish or reddish brown, brown, iron-black
- Crystal habit: Tabular prismatic, radially fibrous in botryoidal masses
- Twinning: Ubiquitous polysynthetic on {100} and {110}
- Cleavage: {001} distinct
- Fracture: Irregular uneven to subconchoidal
- Tenacity: Brittle
- Mohs scale hardness: 6.5
- Luster: Greasy to vitreous
- Streak: White
- Diaphaneity: Transparent to translucent
- Specific gravity: 5.5–6
- Optical properties: Biaxial (–)
- Refractive index: n_{α} = 2.130 n_{β} = 2.190 n_{γ} = 2.200
- Birefringence: δ = 0.070
- Pleochroism: X = yellow, reddish brown, oil-green; Y = oil-green, reddish brown; Z = brown, light brown
- 2V angle: Measured: 30° to 31°
- Dispersion: r > v, rather strong
- Other characteristics: Blue-green cathodoluminescence

Baddeleyite is a rare zirconium oxide mineral (ZrO_{2} or zirconia), occurring in a variety of monoclinic prismatic crystal forms. It is transparent to translucent, has high indices of refraction, and ranges from colorless to yellow, green, and dark brown. See etymology below.

Baddeleyite is a refractory mineral, with a melting point of 2700 °C. Hafnium is a substituting impurity and may be present in quantities ranging from 0.1 to several percent.

It can be found in igneous rocks containing potassium feldspar and plagioclase. Baddeleyite is commonly not found with zircon (ZrSiO_{4}), because it forms in silica-undersaturated rocks, such as mafic rocks. This is because, when silica is free in the system (silica-saturated/oversaturated), zircon is the dominating phase, not baddeleyite. It belongs to the monoclinic-prismatic class, of the P2_{1}/c crystal system. It has been used for geochronology.

== Geologic occurrence ==
Baddeleyite was first found in Sri Lanka in 1892. It can be found in numerous terrestrial and extraterrestrial rocks. Some of these terrestrial rocks are carbonatite, kimberlite, alkaline syenite, some rocks of layered mafic intrusions, diabase dikes, gabbroid sills and anorthosite. Some examples of extraterrestrial rocks are tektites, meteorites and lunar basalt. Studies have shown that zircon and baddeleyite can be recovered from some anorthositic rocks in Proterozoic anorthosite complexes. Places where these Proterozoic anorthosite complexes can be found are: the Laramie Anorthosite Complex in Wyoming, the Nain and Grenville provinces of Canada, the Vico Volcanic Complex in Italy, and Minas Gerais and Jacupiranga, São Paulo, Brazil. Baddeleyite forms in igneous rocks low in silica, it can be found in rocks containing potassium feldspar and plagioclase. It has been observed in thin section that baddeleyite forms within plagioclase grains. Associated minerals include ilmenite, zirkelite, apatite, magnetite, perovskite, fluorite, nepheline, pyrochlore and allanite.

Because of their refractory nature and stability under diverse conditions, baddeleyite grains, along with zircon, are used for uranium-lead radiometric age determinations.

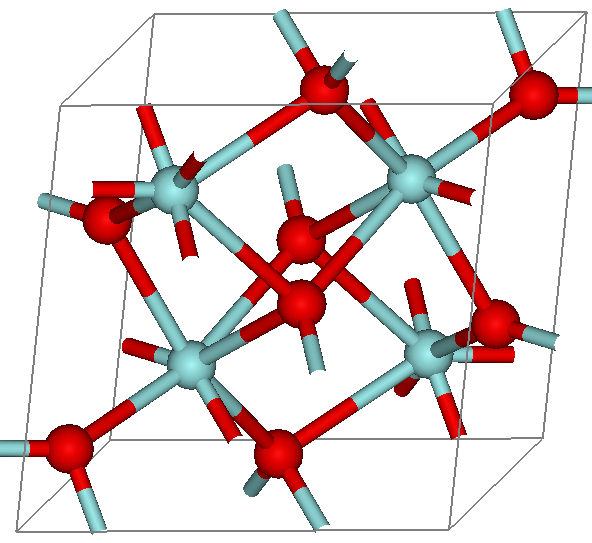
Crystal structure of baddeleyite

== Structure ==
There has been some dispute in the structure of baddeleyite. Originally, the mineral was assigned to the 8-fold coordination by Naray Szabo. This structure was ruled out due to the inaccuracy of the data used to establish it.

Baddeleyite has the group symmetry P2_{1}/c with four ZrO_{2} in the unit cell. It has unit cell dimensions of: a = 5.169 b = 5.232 c = 5.341 Å (all ± 0.008 Å), β = 99˚15ˊ ± 10ˊ.

The coordination number for ZrO_{2} has been found to be 7. The mineral has two types of separations. The first being the seven shortest Zr-O, ranging from 2.04 to 2.26 Å, and the second Zr-O separation is 3.77 Å. Because of this, the coordination of baddeleyite was determined to be sevenfold. Baddeleyite's structure is a combination of tetrahedrally coordinated oxide ions parallel to (100) with triangular coordinated oxide ions. This explains baddeleyite's tendency to twin along the (100) planes. It has been observed that baddeleyite without twinning is extremely rare.

== Composition ==
Baddeleyite belongs to the oxide group, having a composition of ZrO_{2}. Similar minerals belonging to the same group are the rutile group: rutile (TiO_{2}), pyrolusite (MnO_{2}), cassiterite (SnO_{2}), uraninite (UO_{2}) and thorianite (ThO_{2}). Baddeleyite is chemically homogeneous, but it may contain impurities such as Ti, Hf, and Fe. Higher concentrations of Ti and Fe are restricted to mafic-ultramafic rocks.

== Physical properties ==
Baddeleyite is black in color with a submetallic lustre. It has a 6.5 hardness, and a brownish-white streak. Baddeleyite can also be brown, brownish black, green, and greenish brown. Its streak is white, or brownish white. It has a distinct cleavage along {001} and tends to twin along (100). It belongs to the monoclinic system and is part of the P21/c group.

== Origin of the name ==
It was named for Joseph Baddeley. The mineral was discovered in Rakwana, Ceylon (now Sri Lanka). Baddeley was a superintendent of a railroad project in Rakwana. As recounted by J.J.H. Teall – director of the British Geological Survey in the early 1900s – baddeleyite was discovered consequent to the discovery of geikielite.

Baddeley sent specimens of several pebbles from the Rakwana railroad excavations to the Museum of Practical Geology in London, where a Mr. Pringle examined them and attempted to classify them. Pringle was unable to assign the specimens to a known mineral species and submitted them to Teall. After analyzing the specimens, Teall concluded that the mineral was mainly composed of titanic acid and magnesia, with an incidental mixture of protoxide of iron. Geikielite has the composition of MgTiO_{3}. Teall and Pringle decided to name the new mineral geikielite, naming it after Sir Archibald Geikie, then the Director General of the Geological Survey.

Baddeley sent more specimens to Teall, in order to provide an exemplary specimen for display at the Museum of Practical Geology. While trying to find the specimens, Teall noticed that one of them was different from the rest: This new mineral was black in color, with a submetallic lustre, and a hardness of 6.5 . After analyzing it, the odd mineral was determined to not be MgTiO_{3} (geikielite), but instead ZrO_{2}. Teall proposed mineral name baddeleyite, after Joseph Baddeley, to honor the man who brought the two new minerals to notice.

== See also ==
- List of minerals
- List of minerals named after people
