= Hafnium compounds =

Any chemical compound having at least one atom of hafnium

Hafnium compounds are compounds containing the element hafnium (Hf). Due to the lanthanide contraction, the ionic radius of hafnium(IV) (0.78 ångström) is almost the same as that of zirconium(IV) (0.79 angstroms). Consequently, compounds of hafnium(IV) and zirconium(IV) have very similar chemical and physical properties. Hafnium and zirconium tend to occur together in nature and the similarity of their ionic radii makes their chemical separation rather difficult. Hafnium tends to form inorganic compounds in the oxidation state of +4. Halogens react with it to form hafnium tetrahalides. At higher temperatures, hafnium reacts with oxygen, nitrogen, carbon, boron, sulfur, and silicon. Some compounds of hafnium in lower oxidation states are known.

== Halides ==
Hafnium(IV) fluoride (HfF_{4}) is a white crystalline powder. It has a monoclinic crystal structure, with space group C2/c (No.15), and lattice constants a = 1.17 nm, b = 0.986 nm and c = 0.764 nm. Hafnium(IV) chloride (HfCl_{4}) is also a white crystalline powder, with a monoclinic structure. It can be prepared in many ways:

- By the reaction of carbon tetrachloride and hafnium oxide at above 450 °C;

HfO_{2} + 2 CCl_{4} → HfCl_{4} + 2 COCl_{2}

- Chlorination of a mixture of HfO_{2} and carbon above 600 °C using chlorine gas or sulfur monochloride:

HfO_{2} + 2 Cl_{2} + C → HfCl_{4} + CO_{2}

- Chlorination of hafnium carbide above 250 °C.

Hafnium(IV) bromide (HfBr_{4}) is a colourless, diamagnetic moisture sensitive solid that sublimes in vacuum. It adopts a structure very similar to that of zirconium tetrabromide, featuring tetrahedral Hf centers, in contrast to the polymeric nature of hafnium tetrachloride. Hafnium(IV) iodide (HfI_{4}) is a red-orange, moisture sensitive, sublimable solid that is produced by heating a mixture of hafnium with excess iodine. It is an intermediate in the crystal bar process for producing hafnium metal. In this compound, the hafnium centers adopt octahedral coordination geometry. Like most binary metal halides, the compound is a polymeric. It is one-dimensional polymer consisting of chains of edge-shared bioctahedral Hf_{2}I_{8} subunits, similar to the motif adopted by HfCl_{4}. The nonbridging iodide ligands have shorter bonds to Hf than the bridging iodide ligands.

Hafnium(IV) chloride and hafnium(IV) iodide have some applications in the production and purification of hafnium metal. They are volatile solids with polymeric structures. These tetrachlorides are precursors to various organohafnium compounds such as hafnocene dichloride and tetrabenzylhafnium.

Hafnium does form lower halides such as hafnium(III) iodide. Hafnium trihalides are strongly reducing compounds and as such do not have any aqueous chemistry.

== Oxides ==
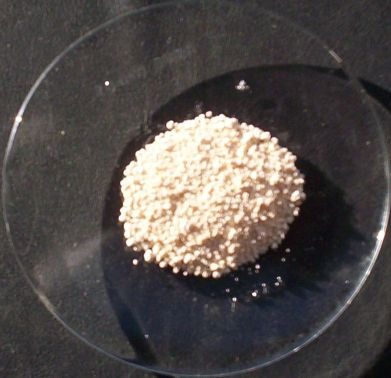
Hafnium(IV) oxide

The white hafnium(IV) oxide (HfO_{2}), also known as hafnium dioxide or hafnia, with a melting point of 2,812 °C and a boiling point of roughly 5,100 °C, is very similar to zirconia, but slightly more basic. It is an electrical insulator with a band gap of 5.3~5.7 eV.

Hafnium(IV) oxide typically adopts the same structure as zirconia (ZrO_{2}). Unlike TiO_{2}, which features six-coordinate Ti in all phases, zirconia and hafnia consist of seven-coordinate metal centres. A variety of other crystalline phases have been experimentally observed, including cubic fluorite (Fm3̅m), tetragonal (P4_{2}/nmc), monoclinic (P2_{1}/c) and orthorhombic (Pbca and Pnma). It is also known that hafnia may adopt two other orthorhombic metastable phases (space group Pca2_{1} and Pmn2_{1}) over a wide range of pressures and temperatures, presumably being the sources of the ferroelectricity observed in thin films of hafnia.

Thin films of hafnium oxides deposited by atomic layer deposition are usually crystalline. Because semiconductor devices benefit from having amorphous films present, researchers have alloyed hafnium oxide with aluminum or silicon (forming hafnium silicates), which have a higher crystallization temperature than hafnium oxide.

== Other compounds ==
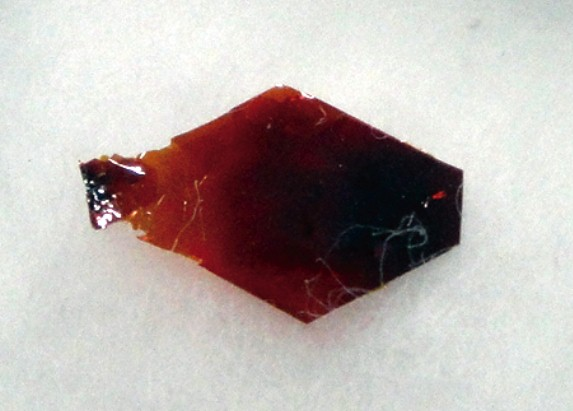
Hafnium disulfide chips

Hafnium diboride belongs to the class of ultra-high temperature ceramics, a type of refractory ceramic composed of hafnium and boron. It has a melting temperature of about 3250 °C. It is an unusual ceramic, having relatively high thermal and electrical conductivities, properties it shares with isostructural titanium diboride and zirconium diboride. Nanocrystals of HfB_{2} with rose-like morphology were obtained combining HfO_{2} and NaBH_{4} at 700-900°C under argon flow:

HfO_{2} + 3NaBH_{4} → HfB_{2} + 2Na(g,l) + NaBO_{2} + 6H_{2}(g)

Hafnium carbide is the most refractory binary compound known, with a melting point over 3,890 °C, and hafnium nitride is the most refractory of all known metal nitrides, with a melting point of 3,310 °C. This has led to proposals that hafnium or its carbides might be useful as construction materials that are subjected to very high temperatures. The mixed carbide tantalum hafnium carbide (Ta_{4}HfC_{5}) possesses the highest melting point of any currently known compound, 4,263 K (3,990 °C; 7,214 °F). Recent supercomputer simulations suggest a hafnium alloy with a melting point of 4,400 K.

Hafnium forms both a hafnium(III) and a hafnium(IV) nitride.

Hafnium silicate (HfSiO_{4}) is a silicate of hafnium, and it is a tetragonal crystal. Thin films of hafnium silicate and zirconium silicate grown by atomic layer deposition, chemical vapor deposition or MOCVD, can be used as a high-κ dielectric as a replacement for silicon dioxide in modern semiconductor devices. Hafnium(IV) nitrate (Hf(NO_{3})_{4}) is the nitrate of hafnium(IV). It can be prepared by the reaction of hafnium tetrachloride and dinitrogen pentoxide.

Hafnium disulfide is a layered dichalcogenide with the chemical formula of HfS_{2}. A few atomic layers of this material can be exfoliated using the standard Scotch Tape technique (see graphene) and used for the fabrication of a field-effect transistor. High-yield synthesis of HfS_{2} has also been demonstrated using liquid phase exfoliation, resulting in the production of stable few-layer HfS_{2} flakes. Hafnium disulfide powder can be produced by reacting hydrogen sulfide and hafnium oxides at 500–1300 °C.

== See also ==
- Titanium compounds
- Zirconium compounds
- Lutetium compounds
- Tantalum compounds
- Lanthanide contraction
