= Hafnium trifluoromethanesulfonate =

Hafnium(IV) triflate

Names
- IUPAC name Hafnium(IV) trifluoromethanesulfonate

Identifiers
CAS Number	161337-67-3
3D model (JSmol)	Interactive image
ChemSpider	21170913
EC Number	624-948-5
PubChem CID	9853707
CompTox Dashboard (EPA)	DTXSID201336882
- InChI: InChI=1S/4CHF3O3S.Hf/c4*2-1(3,4)8(5,6)7;/h4*(H,5,6,7);/q;;;;+4/p-4 Key: BQYMOILRPDTPPJ-UHFFFAOYSA-J
- SMILES: C(F)(F)(F)S(=O)(=O)[O-].C(F)(F)(F)S(=O)(=O)[O-].C(F)(F)(F)S(=O)(=O)[O-].C(F)(F)(F)S(=O)(=O)[O-].[Hf+4]

Properties
Chemical formula	Hf(OTf)_{4}
Molar mass	774.8 g/mol
Appearance	Colourless solid
Melting point	350 °C (662 °F; 623 K)

Hazards
- Occupational safety and health (OHS/OSH)
Main hazards	irritantant
- GHS labelling
Pictograms	(GHS05: Corrosive) (GHS07: Exclamation mark)
Signal word	Danger
Hazard statements	H314, H315, H319, H335
Precautionary statements	P261, P264, P271, P280, P302+P352, P304+P340, P305+P351+P338, P312, P321, P332+P313, P337+P313, P362, P403+P233, P405, P501
Flash point	Non-flammable
- Safety data sheet (SDS)

Related compounds
Other anions	Hafnium tetrachloride Hafnium tetrafluoride Hafnium(IV) bromide Hafnium(IV) iodide
Other cations	Titanium(IV) triflate Zirconium(IV) triflate
- Except where otherwise noted, data are given for materials in their standard state (at 25 °C [77 °F], 100 kPa). verify (what is ?) Infobox references

Hafnium(IV) triflate or hafnium trifluoromethansulfonate is a salt with the formula Hf(OSO_{2}CF_{3})_{4}, also written as Hf(OTf)_{4}. Hafnium triflate is used as an impure mixture as a catalyst. Hafnium (IV) has an ionic radius of intermediate range (Al < Ti < Hf < Zr < Sc < Ln) and has an oxophilic hard character typical of group IV metals. This solid is a stronger Lewis acid than its typical precursor hafnium tetrachloride, HfCl_{4}, because of the strong electron-withdrawing nature of the four triflate groups, which makes it a great Lewis acid and has many uses including as a great catalyst at low Lewis acid loadings for electrophilic aromatic substitution and nucleophilic substitution reactions.

== Preparation ==
The compound was first synthesized by the Kobayashi group in 1995 via the reaction of HfCl_{4} and triflic acid. This solid is air stable, easy to handle, and commercially available.

== Uses ==
=== Electrophilic Substitutions ===
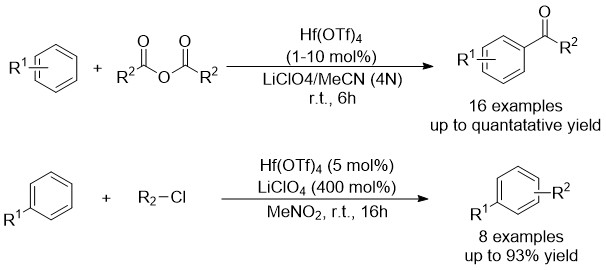
Hf(OTf)_{4} catalyzed Friedel-Craft acylation and alkylation reactions

Friedel-Craft acylation or alkylation reactions are some of the most important synthetic methodologies to introduce carbonyl or alkyl groups onto aromatic compounds. The first Hf(OTf)_{4} catalyzed Friedel-Crafts acylation was developed by Kobayashi et al. in 1995. The authors demonstrated that Friedel-Crafts acylation could be achieved in excellent yield between arenes and acid anhydrides when utilizing Hf(OTf)_{4} as a catalyst. Hf(OTf)_{4}, was the most effective in comparison to other Lewis acids including BF_{3} • OEt_{2}, Sc(OTf)_{3}, and Zr(OTf)_{4}. Similalrly, Hf(OTf)_{4} shows excellent activity in Friedel-Crafts alkylation's, and enabled the alkylation of benzene with benzylic and tertiary alkyl chlorides.

Hf(OTf)_{4}-catalyzed Friedel-Crafts alkylation has been utilized in the total synthesis of the altertoxin III framework. This approach provided a more efficient synthesis of the fused-ring structure compared to previous methods.

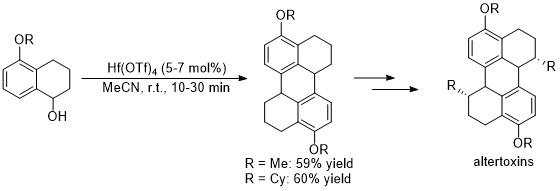
Hf(OTf)_{4} mediated synthesis of altertoxins

Hf(OTf)_{4}, alongside Sc(OTf)_{3} and In(OTf)_{3}, has been shown to activate alkynes and enable electrophilic substitution. In 2004 Song and Lee et al. reported Hf(OTf)_{4}-catalyzed Friedel-Crafts alkenylation of benzene with alkenyl derivatives.

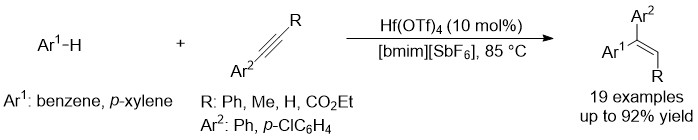
Hf(OTf)_{4} enabled electrophilic substitution of alkynes

=== Nucleophilic Substitutions ===
In 2008, Zhu et al. demonstrated that Hf(OTf)_{4} was an effective catalyst for the thioacetalization of aldehydes and ketones. In the absence of Lewis acid this reaction can occur in glycerol at 90 °C. Hf(OTf)_{4} accelerated the reaction rate under milder conditions with only 0.1 mol% catalyst loading. For example, Hf(OTf)_{4} catalyzes the reaction between benzaldehyde and 2.0 equiv. of either ethanethiol or 1.0 equiv. of propane-1,3,-dithiol readily in quantitative yield.

Hf(OTf)_{4} catalyzed thioacetalization of benzaldehyde

This methodology was utilized in the total synthesis of (-)-leucomidine B from an enantioenriched monoacid synthesized via a Hf(OTf)_{4} catalyzed thioacetalization.

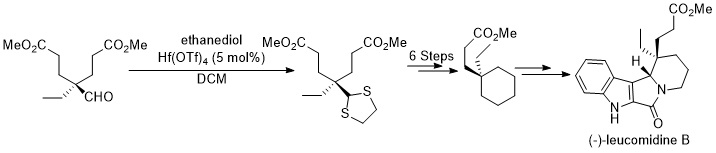
Total synthesis of (-)-leucomidine B

In 2009, Nakamura et al. demonstrated that Hf(OTf)_{4} was uniquely able to catalyzed a Prins reaction between an aryl aldehyde and an O-protected/unprotected cyclohex-3-ene-1,2-dimethanol.

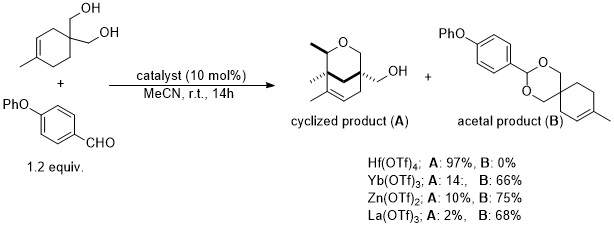
Hf(OTf)_{4} catalyzed Prins cyclization
