= Nanobottle =

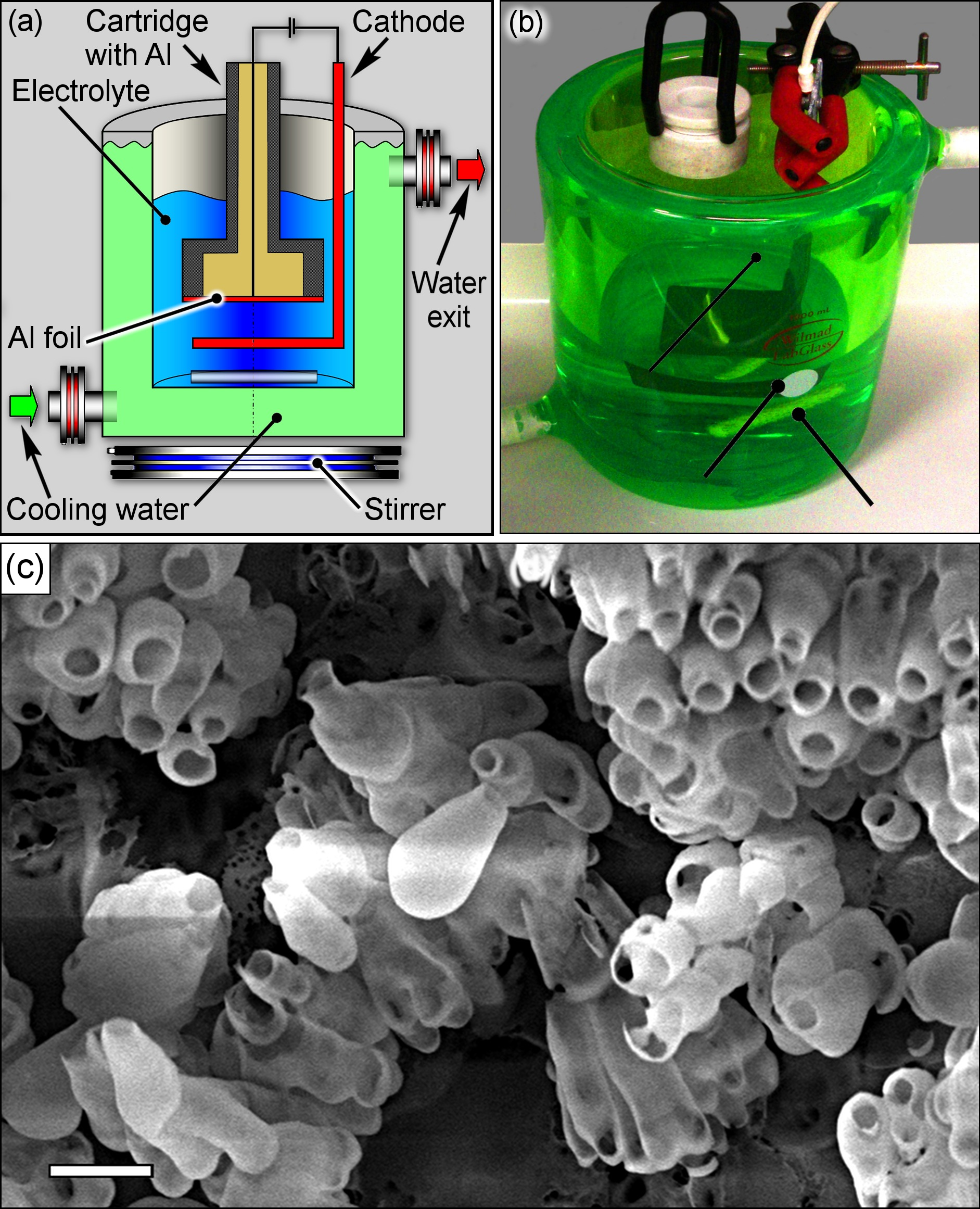
Experimental setup used for one-step grows of alumina nanobottles by electrochemical anodization: (a) schematic and (b) photograph. (c) Representative SEM image of the free-standing nanobottles after etching in phosphoric acid. Scale bar is 500 nm.

Nanobottles are hollow bottle-shaped particle with the maximal dimension smaller or comparable with 1 micrometer. They can be used for storing and distributing various chemical compounds, for example, inside the human body.

== Laboratory synthesis ==
Carbon nanotubes capped at one end may be regarded as nanobottles. They can be produced by cutting nanotubes, which are typically capped as both ends after the growth.

Nanobottles were also fabricated in a three-step process: First, voids were created in aluminium foils. Then a thin layer of non-Al material, such as carbon, germanium, silicon, silica or hafnia, was deposited into the voids, and the surrounding matrix was etched away.

Alumina nanobottles were produced in one step by electrochemical anodization of aluminium foil in phosphoric acid: Pores were etched in Al by the acid, and their inner surface was oxidized in the process. Then the Al matrix, but not the oxidized aluminium, was etched away by the acid. The transition from pore creation to Al etching was achieved by controlling the pulse profile of the anodization voltage. The entire synthesis took about 2 hours. The resulting nanobottles had a volume of ca. 10^{−7} liters.

Hollow silica nanospheres have been produced hydrothermally from a tetraethoxysilane-based gel mixture in a Teflon-lined autoclave at 100 °C within 3 days. Subsequent calcination at 550 °C for 5 hours removed the organic components from the spheres and created single holes (mostly) in them, yielding spherical nanobottles.

Arrays of gold nanobottles have been fabricated by combining optical interference lithography with thin film deposition. Their dimensions could be tuned by varying the lithography optics and the film thickness.

== Natural occurrence ==
Carbon nanobottles carrying planetary gases, mostly argon, were found in carbonaceous chondrite meteorites.

== Potential applications ==
Nanobottles can be filled with various chemical compounds, which can be used for transporting those compounds in the human body. They can be moved around by magnetic field, after adding a magnetic compound into the bottle content. Encapsulating rare-earth compounds in nanobottles may result in new phosphors, where the rare-earth ions are separated by the bottle walls, suppressing the concentration quenching of light emission from those ions.

Regular two-dimensional arrays of metallic nanobottles may find applications in plasmonic devices, whose resonant frequency depends on the nanobottle geometry.
