= Hafnium disulfide =

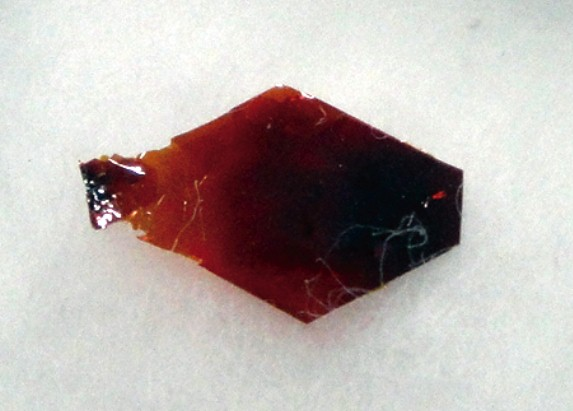

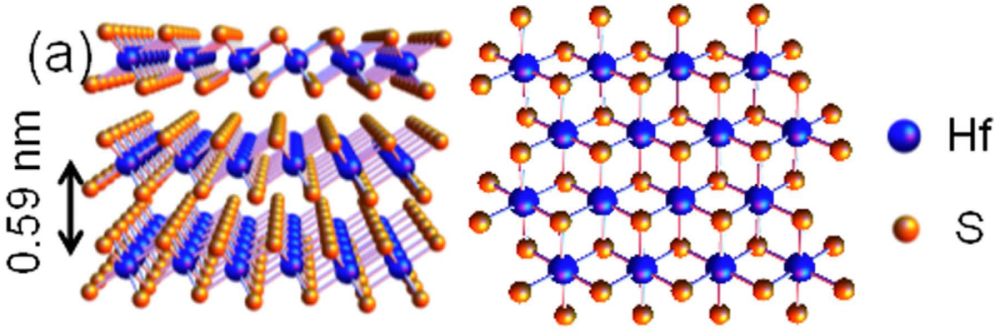

Names
- IUPAC name Hafnium disulfide

Identifiers
CAS Number	18855-94-2
3D model (JSmol)	Interactive image
ChemSpider	8374205
ECHA InfoCard	100.038.738
PubChem CID	101811522
CompTox Dashboard (EPA)	DTXSID301314401
- InChI: InChI=1S/Hf.2S
- SMILES: S=[Hf]=S

Properties
Chemical formula	HfS_{2}
Molar mass	246.62 g/mol
Appearance	Red/Brown solid
Density	6.03 g/cm^{3}
Band gap	~1.8 eV (indirect)

Structure
Crystal structure	hP3, P3̅m1, No 164
Lattice constant	a = 0.363 nm, c = 0.584 nm
Formula units (Z)	1

Related compounds
Other anions	Hafnium dioxide
Other cations	Tungsten disulfide Molybdenum disulfide
- Except where otherwise noted, data are given for materials in their standard state (at 25 °C [77 °F], 100 kPa). verify (what is ?) Infobox references

Hafnium disulfide is an inorganic compound of hafnium and sulfur. It is a layered dichalcogenide with the chemical formula is HfS_{2}. A few atomic layers of this material can be exfoliated using the standard Scotch Tape technique (see graphene) and used for the fabrication of a field-effect transistor. High-yield synthesis of HfS_{2} has also been demonstrated using liquid phase exfoliation, resulting in the production of stable few-layer HfS_{2} flakes. Hafnium disulfide powder can be produced by reacting hydrogen sulfide and hafnium oxides at 500–1300 °C.
