= Hafnium tetrachloride =

Hafnium(IV) chloride
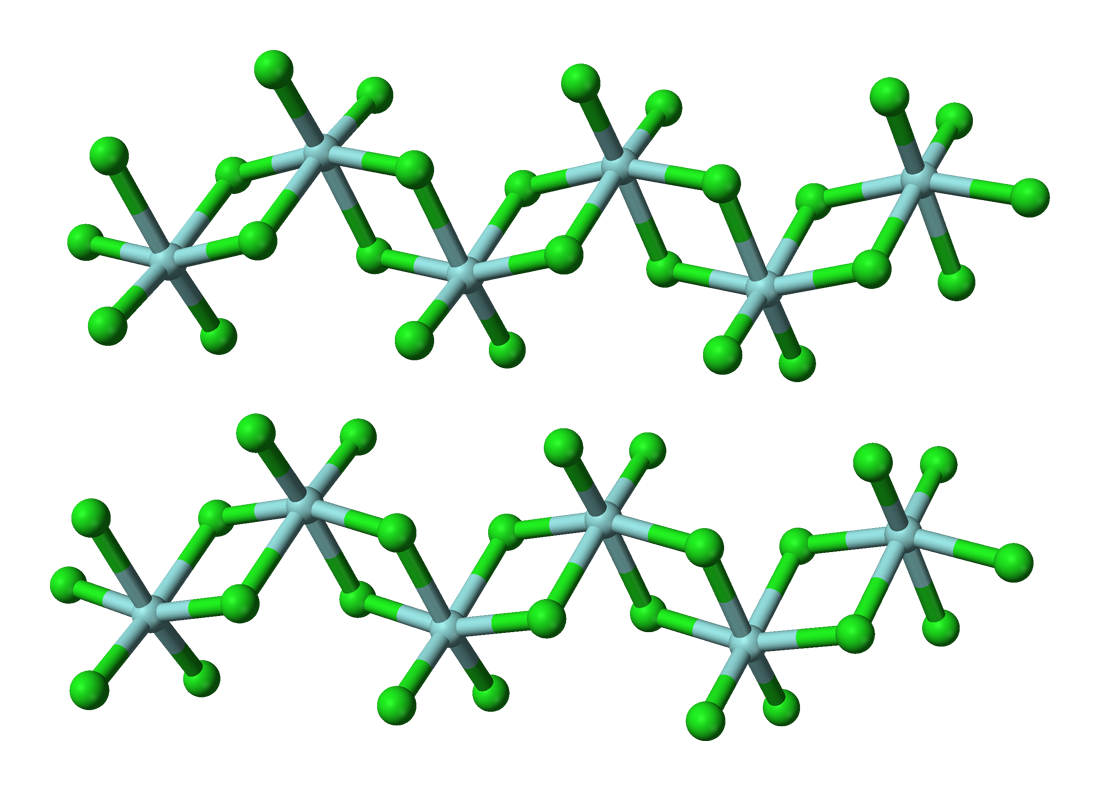

Names
- IUPAC names Hafnium(IV) chloride Hafnium tetrachloride

Identifiers
CAS Number	13499-05-3
3D model (JSmol)	monomer: Interactive image; polymer: Interactive image
ChemSpider	34591
ECHA InfoCard	100.033.463
PubChem CID	37715
UNII	CNZ9V5JM5H
CompTox Dashboard (EPA)	DTXSID0065513
- InChI: InChI=1S/4ClH.Hf/h4*1H;/q;;;;+4/p-4 Key: PDPJQWYGJJBYLF-UHFFFAOYSA-J; InChI=1/4ClH.Hf/h4*1H;/q;;;;+4/p-4 Key: PDPJQWYGJJBYLF-XBHQNQODAR
- SMILES: monomer: Cl[Hf](Cl)(Cl)Cl; polymer: Cl[Hf-2](Cl)(Cl)(Cl)([Cl+]1)[Cl+][Hf-2]1(Cl)(Cl)([Cl+]1)[Cl+][Hf-2]1(Cl)(Cl)([Cl+]1)[Cl+][Hf-2]1(Cl)(Cl)([Cl+]1)[Cl+][Hf-2]1(Cl)(Cl)([Cl+]1)[Cl+][Hf-2]1(Cl)(Cl)([Cl+]1)[Cl+][Hf-2]1(Cl)(Cl)([Cl+]1)[Cl+][Hf-2]1(Cl)(Cl)([Cl+]1)[Cl+][Hf-2]1(Cl)(Cl)([Cl+]1)[Cl+][Hf-2]1(Cl)(Cl)(Cl)Cl

Properties
Chemical formula	HfCl_{4}
Molar mass	320.302 g/mol
Appearance	white crystalline solid
Density	3.89 g/cm^{3}
Melting point	432 °C (810 °F; 705 K)
Solubility in water	decomposes
Vapor pressure	1 mmHg at 190 °C

Structure
Crystal structure	Monoclinic, mP10
Space group	C2/c, No. 13
Lattice constant	a = 0.6327 nm, b = 0.7377 nm, c = 0.62 nm
Coordination geometry	4

Hazards
- Occupational safety and health (OHS/OSH)
Main hazards	irritant and corrosive
Flash point	Non-flammable
- Lethal dose or concentration (LD, LC)
LD_{50} (median dose)	2362 mg/kg (rat, oral)
Safety data sheet (SDS)	MSDS

Related compounds
Other anions	Hafnium tetrafluoride Hafnium(IV) bromide Hafnium(IV) iodide
Other cations	Titanium(IV) chloride Zirconium(IV) chloride
- Except where otherwise noted, data are given for materials in their standard state (at 25 °C [77 °F], 100 kPa). verify (what is ?) Infobox references

Hafnium(IV) chloride is the inorganic compound with the formula HfCl_{4}. This colourless solid is the precursor to most hafnium organometallic compounds. It has a variety of highly specialized applications, mainly in materials science and as a catalyst.

== Preparation ==
HfCl_{4} can be produced by several related procedures:

- The reaction of carbon tetrachloride and hafnium oxide at above 450 °C;

HfO_{2} + 2 CCl_{4} → HfCl_{4} + 2 COCl_{2}

- Chlorination of a mixture of HfO_{2} and carbon above 600 °C using chlorine gas or sulfur monochloride:

HfO_{2} + 2 Cl_{2} + C → HfCl_{4} + CO_{2}

- Chlorination of hafnium carbide above 250 °C.

== Separation of Zr and Hf ==
Hafnium and zirconium occur together in minerals such as zircon, cyrtolite and baddeleyite. Zircon contains 0.05% to 2.0% hafnium dioxide HfO_{2}, cyrtolite with 5.5% to 17% HfO_{2} and baddeleyite contains 1.0 to 1.8 percent HfO_{2}. Hafnium and zirconium compounds are extracted from ores together and converted to a mixture of the tetrachlorides.

The separation of HfCl_{4} and ZrCl_{4} is difficult because the compounds of Hf and Zr have very similar chemical and physical properties. Their atomic radii are similar: the atomic radius is 156.4 pm for hafnium, whereas that of Zr is 160 pm. These two metals undergo similar reactions and form similar coordination complexes. However, their behavior inside a nuclear reactor is quite different from each other. While hafnium is a strong neutron poison, zirconium barely interacts with free neutrons at all. Consequently zirconium alloys are used for cladding in nuclear fuel rods while hafnium is sometimes employed in control rods. Hence the need to separate the two elements for nuclear applications.

A number of processes have been proposed to purify HfCl_{4} from ZrCl_{4} including fractional distillation, fractional precipitation, fractional crystallization and ion exchange. The log (base 10) of the vapor pressure of solid hafnium chloride (from 476 to 681 K) is given by the equation: log_{10} P = −5197/T + 11.712, where the pressure is measured in torrs and temperature in kelvins. (The pressure at the melting point is 23,000 torrs.)

One method is based on the difference in the reducibility between the two tetrahalides. The tetrahalides can in be separated by selectively reducing the zirconium compound to one or more lower halides or even zirconium. The hafnium tetrachloride remains substantially unchanged during the reduction and may be recovered readily from the zirconium subhalides. Hafnium tetrachloride is volatile and can therefore easily be separated from the involatile zirconium trihalide.

== Structure and bonding ==
This group 4 halide contains hafnium in the +4 oxidation state. Solid HfCl_{4} is a polymer with octahedral Hf centers. Of the six chloride ligands surrounding each Hf centre, two chloride ligands are terminal and four bridge to another Hf centre. In the gas phase, both ZrCl_{4} and HfCl_{4} adopt the monomeric tetrahedral structure seen for TiCl_{4}. Electronographic investigations of HfCl_{4} in gas phase showed that the Hf-Cl internuclear distance is 2.33 Å and the Cl...Cl internuclear distance is 3.80 Å. The ratio of intenuclear distances r(Me-Cl)/r(Cl...Cl) is 1.630 and this value agrees well with the value for the regular tetrahedron model (1.633).

== Reactivity ==
Structure of HfCl_{4}(thf)_{2}.

The compound hydrolyzes, evolving hydrogen chloride:

HfCl_{4} + H_{2}O → HfOCl_{2} + 2 HCl

Aged samples thus often are contaminated with oxychlorides, which are also colourless.

THF forms a monomeric 2:1 complex:

HfCl_{4} + 2 OC_{4}H_{8} → HfCl_{4}(OC_{4}H_{8})_{2}

Because this complex is soluble in organic solvents, it is a useful reagent for preparing other complexes of hafnium.

HfCl_{4} undergoes salt metathesis with Grignard reagents. In this way, tetrabenzylhafnium can be prepared.

4 C_{6}H_{5}CH_{2}MgCl + HfCl_{4} → (C_{6}H_{5}CH_{2})_{4}Hf + 4 MgCl_{2}

Similarly, salt metathesis with sodium cyclopentadienide gives hafnocene dichloride:

2 NaC_{5}H_{5} + HfCl_{4} → (C_{5}H_{5})_{2}HfCl_{2} + 2 NaCl

With alcohols, alkoxides are formed.

HfCl_{4} + 4 ROH → Hf(OR)_{4} + 4 HCl

These compounds adopt complicated structures.

=== Reduction ===
Reduction of HfCl_{4} is especially difficult. In the presence of phosphine ligands, reduction can be effected with sodium–potassium alloy:

2 HfCl_{4} + 2 K + 4 P(C_{2}H_{5})_{3} → Hf_{2}Cl_{6}[P(C_{2}H_{5})_{3}]_{4} + 2 KCl

The deep green dihafnium product is diamagnetic. X-ray crystallography shows that the complex adopts an edge-shared bioctahedral structure, very similar to the Zr analogue.

== Uses ==
Hafnium tetrachloride is the precursor to highly active catalysts for the Ziegler-Natta polymerization of alkenes, especially propylene. Typical catalysts are derived from tetrabenzylhafnium.

HfCl_{4} is an effective Lewis acid for various applications in organic synthesis. For example, ferrocene is alkylated with allyldimethylchlorosilane more efficiently using hafnium chloride relative to aluminium trichloride. The greater size of Hf may diminish HfCl_{4}'s tendency to complex to ferrocene.

HfCl_{4} increases the rate and control of 1,3-dipolar cycloadditions. It was found to yield better results than other Lewis acids when used with aryl and aliphatic aldoximes, allowing specific exo-isomer formation.

=== Microelectronics applications ===
HfCl_{4} was considered as a precursor for chemical vapor deposition and atomic layer deposition of hafnium dioxide and hafnium silicate, used as high-κ dielectrics in manufacture of modern high-density integrated circuits. However, due to its relatively low volatility and corrosive byproducts (namely, HCl), HfCl_{4} was phased out by metal-organic precursors, such as tetrakis ethylmethylamino hafnium (TEMAH).
