= Hafnium nitrides =

Class of chemical compounds

The hafnium nitrides are the various salts produced from combining hafnium and nitrogen. The two most important such are hafnium(III) nitride, HfN; and hafnium(IV) nitride, Hf_{3}N_{4}. None can be prepared from hafnium oxide, but must instead be prepared from the elemental metal or a different hafnium nitride salt; attempted nitridation of the oxide gives an oxynitride instead.

HfN is refractory and generally produced as a thin film coating, although zone annealing gives the bulk material. HfN adopts the rock-salt crystal structure. The surplus hafnium electron delocalizes, so that HfN is a metal, conducting at room temperature and superconducting below 8.8 K (−443.83 °F). Its bright gold color is a cheaper alternative to gilding.

The dark red semiconductor Hf_{3}N_{4} does not form at room temperature, but requires high pressure, high temperature synthesis in a diamond anvil cell. At 18 GPa (180,000 atm) and 2,800 K (4,580 °F), it adopts the cubic crystal structure and repeats according to space group I4̅3d. At lower pressures, the cubic structure is believed metastable, decaying to the orthorhombic structure of zirconium(IV) nitride. That structure forms outright at 19 GPa and 2,000 K (3,140 °F), and another metastable tetragonal structure forms at 12 GPa and 1,500 K (2,240 °F). Computational studies suggest that it may catalyze polymerization of nitrogen at very high temperatures, through a catenary anion in HfN_{10}.

In systems with limited nitrogen, hafnium also forms Hf_{3}N_{2}, as well as a solid solution hafnium alloy.
