= Hafnon =

Hafnium neosilicate mineral

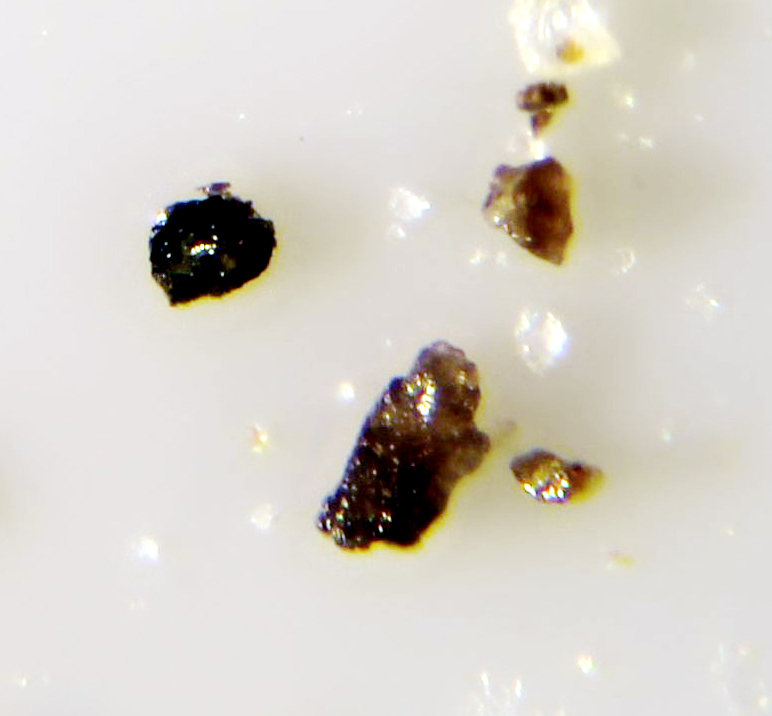
- Very small brown single crystals of hafnon from Bernic Lake, Lac-du-Bonnet District, Manitoba, Canada

General
- Category: Nesosilicates
- Formula: HfSiO_{4}
- IMA symbol: Haf
- Strunz classification: 09.AD.30
- Dana classification: 51.05.02.02
- Crystal system: Tetragonal
- Crystal class: Ditetragonal Dipyramidal (4/mmm ) H-M symbol: (4/m 2/m 2/m)
- Space group: I4_{1}/amd
- Unit cell: a = 6.5725(7) Å, c = 5.9632(4) Å=; Z = 4

Identification
- Colour: Orange-red, brownish yellow, rarely colourless
- Crystal habit: Euhedral to irregular crystals
- Cleavage: {???} Indistinct
- Mohs scale hardness: 7.5
- Luster: Vitreous
- Streak: grey white
- Diaphaneity: Transparent
- Density: 6.97
- Optical properties: Uniaxial (+)
- Refractive index: n_{ω} = 1.930 - 1.970 n_{ε} = 1.980 - 2.030
- Birefringence: δ = 0.050
- Common impurities: Often zoned with zircon. Forms part of zircon-hafnon series

Hafnon is a hafnium nesosilicate mineral with the idealized chemical formula HfSiO_{4}. It is the mineral form of hafnium silicate and one of the few known minerals with essential hafnium.

== Chemistry ==
Hafnon forms a solid-solution series with its zirconium counterpart, zircon (ZrSiO_{4}). Several other variants exist, with compositions such as (Hf,Zr,Th,U,Y)SiO_{4}. In nature, part of zirconium is replaced by the chemically similar hafnium, so natural zircon is never pure ZrSiO_{4}. However, a zircon with 100% hafnium substitution can be synthesized and is known as hafnon.

Hafnon occurs as transparent red to red-orange tetragonal crystals, with a Moh's hardness of 7.5.

Hafnon occurs naturally in tantalum-bearing granite pegmatites in Zambezia (Mozambique), and in weathered pegmatites at Mount Holland, Western Australia. It has also been reported at locations in Ontario, Quebec, and Manitoba, Canada; North Carolina, United States, and Zimbabwe.
