= Zirconium(IV) silicate =

Chemical compound, a silicate of Zirconium

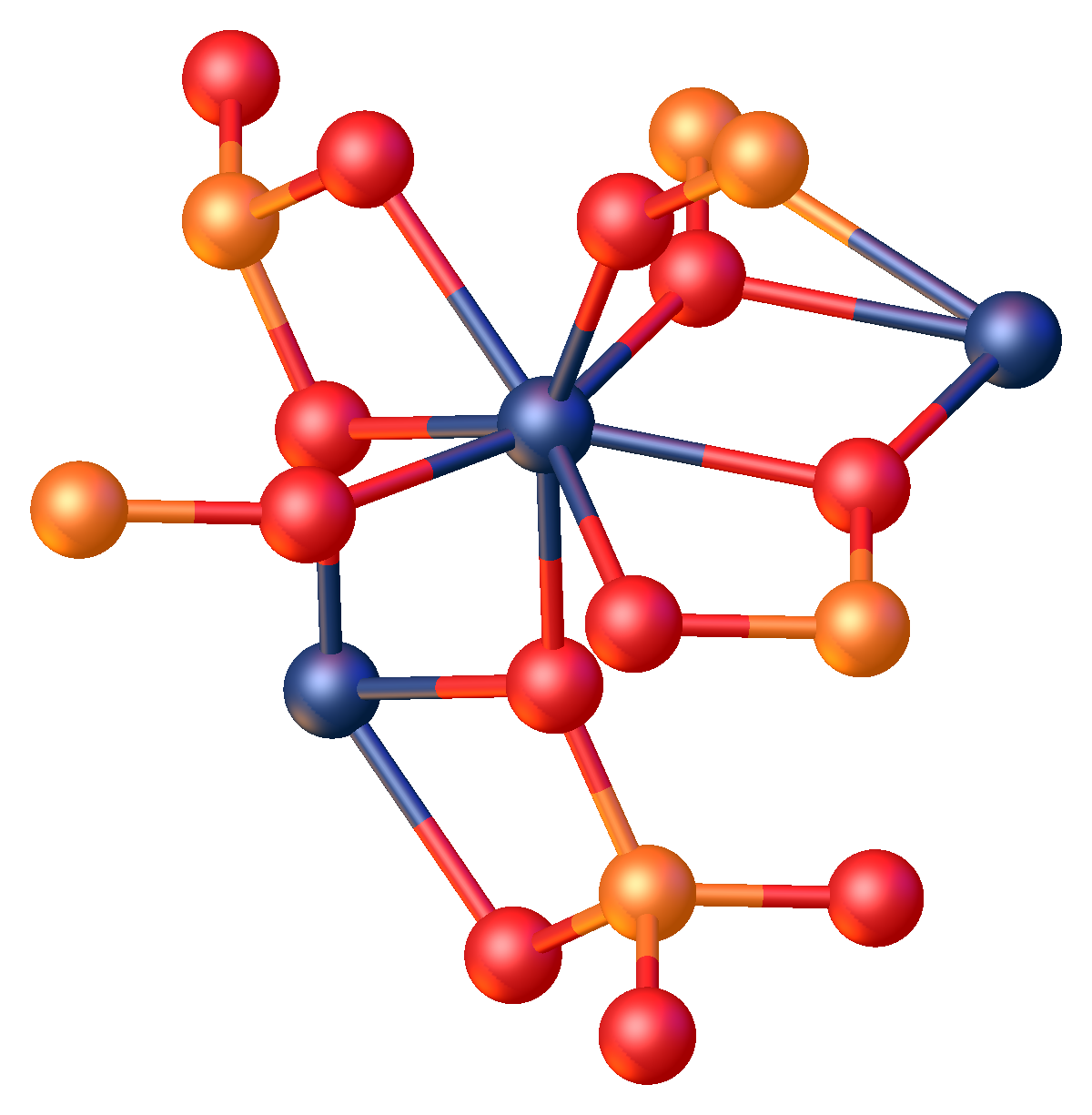

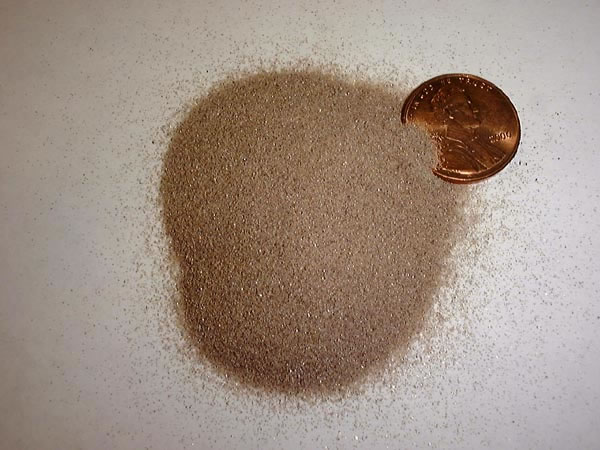

Names
- Preferred IUPAC name Zirconium(IV) silicate
- Systematic IUPAC name Zirconium(4+) silicate
- Other names Zircon Zirconium(4+) orthosilicate Zirconium(IV) orthosilicate

Identifiers
CAS Number	10101-52-7
3D model (JSmol)	Interactive image
ChemSpider	55663
ECHA InfoCard	100.030.216
EC Number	233-252-7
MeSH	Zircon
PubChem CID	61775
UNII	4SY8H89134
CompTox Dashboard (EPA)	DTXSID60892246
- InChI: InChI=1S/O4Si.Zr/c1-5(2,3)4;/q-4;+4 Key: GFQYVLUOOAAOGM-UHFFFAOYSA-N
- SMILES: [Zr+4].[O-][Si]([O-])([O-])[O-]

Properties
Chemical formula	O_{4}SiZr
Molar mass	183.305 g·mol^{−1}
Appearance	Colourless crystals
Density	4.56 g cm^{−3}
Melting point	1,540 °C (2,800 °F; 1,810 K) (decomposes)

Structure
Crystal structure	tetragonal

Thermochemistry
Heat capacity (C)	98.3 J/mol K
Std enthalpy of formation (Δ_{f}H^{⦵}_{298})	−2044 kJ/mol

Hazards
NFPA 704 (fire diamond)	1 0 1
Flash point	Non-flammable
Safety data sheet (SDS)	MSDS
- Except where otherwise noted, data are given for materials in their standard state (at 25 °C [77 °F], 100 kPa). verify (what is ?) Infobox references

Zirconium silicate, also zirconium orthosilicate, ZrSiO_{4}, is a chemical compound, a silicate of zirconium. It occurs in nature as zircon, a silicate mineral. Powdered zirconium silicate is also known as zircon flour.

Zirconium silicate is usually colorless, but impurities induce various colorations. It is insoluble in water, acids, alkali and aqua regia. Its hardness is 7.5 on the Mohs scale.

== Structure and bonding ==
Zircon consists of 8-coordinated Zr^{4+} centers linked to tetrahedral orthosilicate SiO^{4−}_{4} sites. The oxygen atoms are all triply bridging, each with the environment OZr_{2}Si. Given its highly crosslinked structure, the material is hard, and hence prized as gemstone and abrasive.

Zr(IV) is a d^{0} ion. Consequently the material is colorless and diamagnetic.

== Production ==
Zirconium silicate occurs in nature as mineral zircon. Concentrated sources of zircon are rare. It is mined from sand deposits and separated by gravity. Some sands contain a few percent of zircon.

It can also be synthesized by fusion of SiO_{2} and ZrO_{2} in an arc furnace, or by reacting a zirconium salt with sodium silicate in an aqueous solution.

== Uses ==
As of 1995, the annual consumption of zirconium silicate was nearly 1 million tonnes. The major applications exploit its refractory nature and resistance to corrosion by alkali materials. Two end-uses are for enamels, and ceramic glazes. In enamels and glazes it serves as an opacifier. It can be also present in some cements.

Another use of zirconium silicate is as beads for milling and grinding.

Thin films of zirconium silicate and hafnium silicate produced by chemical vapor deposition, most often MOCVD, can be used as a high-κ dielectric as a replacement for silicon dioxide in semiconductors.

Zirconium silicates have also been studied for potential use in medical applications. For example, ZS-9 is a zirconium silicate that was designed specifically to trap potassium ions over other ions throughout the gastrointestinal tract.

Zirconium silicate is also used as foundry sands due to its high thermal stability. It is also the primary source of zirconium, which is used in various applications, including in nuclear reactors, due to its high resistance to corrosion and low neutron absorption.

== Toxicity ==
Zirconium silicate is an abrasive irritant for skin and eyes. Chronic exposure to dust can cause pulmonary granulomas, skin inflammation, and skin granuloma. However, there are no known adverse effects for normal, incidental ingestion.
