= Lutetium compounds =

Chemical compounds

Lutetium compounds are compounds formed by the lanthanide metal lutetium (Lu). In these compounds, lutetium generally exhibits the +3 oxidation state, such as LuCl_{3}, Lu_{2}O_{3} and Lu_{2}(SO_{4})_{3}. Aqueous solutions of most lutetium salts are colorless and form white crystalline solids upon drying, with the common exception of the iodide. The soluble salts, such as nitrate, sulfate and acetate form hydrates upon crystallization. The oxide, hydroxide, fluoride, carbonate, phosphate and oxalate are insoluble in water.

== Oxides ==
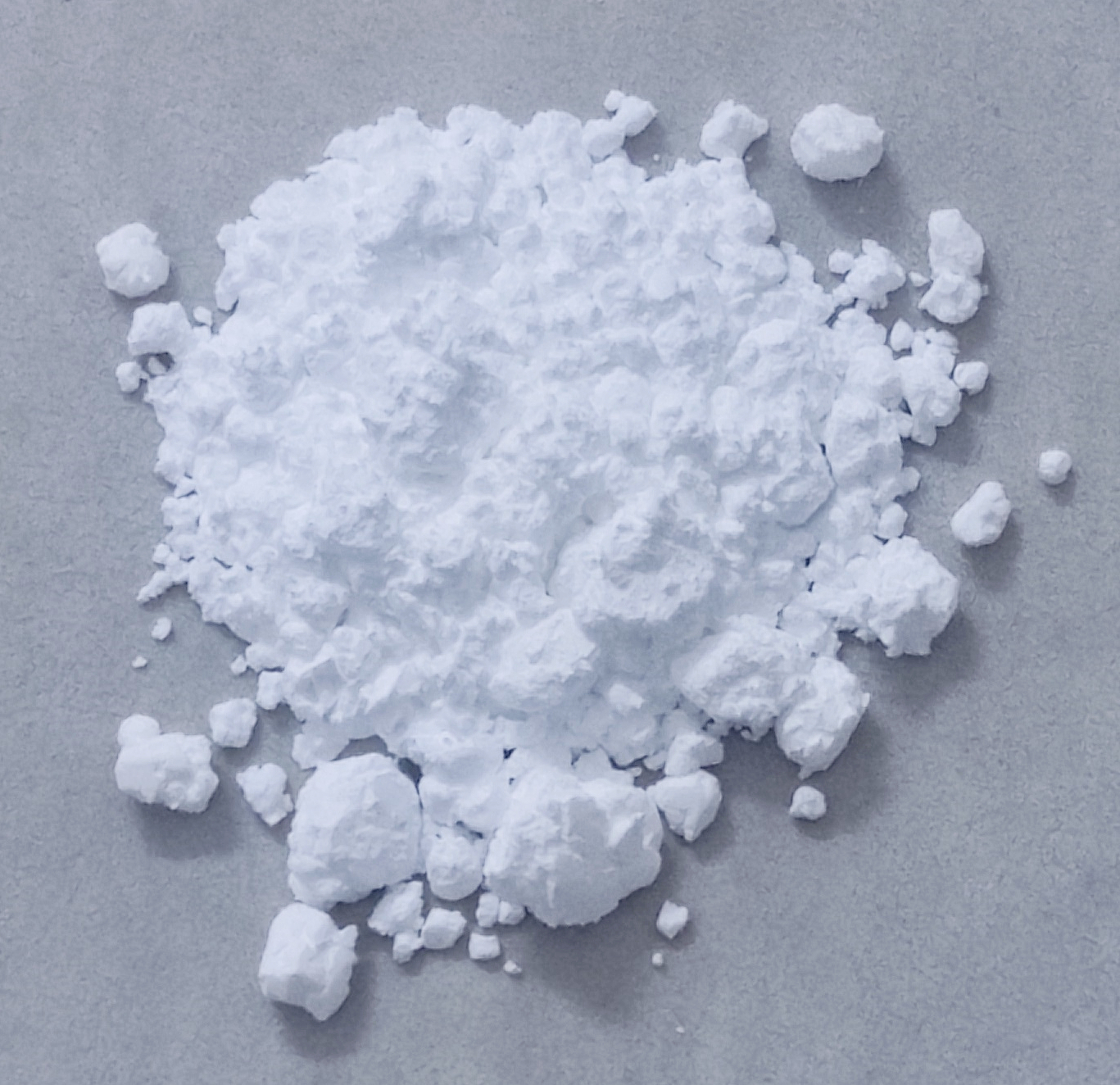
Lutetium(III) oxide

Lutetium(III) oxide is a white solid, a cubic compound of lutetium which sometimes used in the preparation of specialty glasses. It is also called lutecia. It is a lanthanide oxide, also known as a rare earth. Lutetium(III) oxide is an important raw material for laser crystals. It also has specialized uses in ceramics, glass, phosphors, and lasers. Lutetium(III) oxide is used as a catalyst in cracking, alkylation, hydrogenation, and polymerization. The band gap of lutetium oxide is 5.5 eV.

== Halides ==
Lutetium(III) fluoride can be produced by reacting lutetium oxide with hydrogen fluoride, or reacting lutetium chloride and hydrofluoric acid. It can also be produced by reacting lutetium sulfide and hydrofluoric acid:

3 Lu_{2}S_{3}+ 20 HF + (2 + 2x) H_{2}O → 2 (H_{3}O)Lu_{3}F_{10}·xH_{2}O↓ + 9 H_{2}S↑ (x = 0.9)
(H_{3}O)Lu_{3}F_{10} → 3 LuF_{3} + HF↑ + H_{2}O↑

Lutetium oxide and nitrogen trifluoride react at 240 °C to produce LuOF. A second step happens below 460 °C to produce LuF_{3}. Lutetium(III) chloride forms hygroscopic white monoclinic crystals and also a hydroscopic hexahydrate LuCl_{3}·6H_{2}O. Anhydrous lutetium(III) chloride has the YCl_{3} (AlCl_{3}) layer structure with octahedral lutetium ions. Lutetium(III) bromide can be synthesized through the following reaction:

2 Lu(s) + 3 Br_{2}(g) → 2 LuBr_{3}(s)

If burned, lutetium(III) bromide may produce hydrogen bromide and metal oxide fumes. Lutetium(III) bromide reacts to strong oxidizing agents. Lutetium(III) iodide can be obtained by reacting lutetium with iodine:

2 Lu + 3 I_{2} → LuI_{3}

Lutetium(III) iodide can also obtained by the reacting metallic lutetium with mercury iodide in vacuum at 500 °C:

2 Lu + 3 HgI_{2} → 2 LuI_{3} + 3 Hg

The elemental mercury generated in the reaction can be removed by distillation. The lutetium(III) iodide hydrate crystallized from the solution can be heated with ammonium iodide to obtain the anhydrate.

== Coordination compounds ==
=== Nitrogen-containing ligand complexes ===
==== Lutetium phthalocyanine ====
Skeletal formula of lutetium phthalocyanine.

Lutetium phthalocyanine is the most notable coordination compound of lutetium, and is derived from lutetium and two phthalocyanines. It was the first known example of a molecule that is an intrinsic semiconductor. It exhibits electrochromism, changing color when subject to a voltage. It is a double-decker sandwich compound consisting of a Lu^{3+} ion coordinated to two the conjugate base of two phthalocyanines. The rings are arranged in a staggered conformation. The extremities of the two ligands are slightly distorted outwards. The complex features a non-innocent ligand, in the sense that the macrocycles carry an extra electron. It is a free radical with the unpaired electron sitting in a half-filled molecular orbital between the highest occupied and lowest unoccupied orbitals, allowing its electronic properties to be finely tuned. It, along with many substituted derivatives like the alkoxy-methyl derivative Lu[(C_{8}H_{17}OCH_{2})_{8}Pc]_{2}, can be deposited as a thin film with intrinsic semiconductor properties; said properties arise due to its radical nature and its low reduction potential compared to other metal phthalocyanines. This initially green film exhibits electrochromism; the oxidized form LuPc^{+}_{2} is red, whereas the reduced form LuPc^{−}_{2} is blue and the next two reduced forms are dark blue and violet, respectively. The green/red oxidation cycle can be repeated over 10,000 times in aqueous solution with dissolved alkali metal halides, before it is degraded by hydroxide ions; the green/blue redox degrades faster in water.

==== Other complexes ====
[LuI_{2}(HO^{i}Pr)_{4}]I can be dissolved in pyridine-THF to give yellow [LuI(O^{i}Pr)(py)_{5}]I. LuI_{3} is directly dissolved in pyridine-THF to obtain yellow [LuI_{2}(py)_{5}]I. In both compounds pyridine is coordinated to lutetium by nitrogen atom. Lutetium(III) nitrate can be crystallized with 2,2':6',2"-terpyridine (terpy) in dry acetonitrile to obtain colorless [Lu(terpy)(NO_{3})_{3}], in which the nitrogen atom and the oxygen atom of the nitrate are coordinated to the lutetium atom.

=== Oxygen-containing ligand complexes ===
In the lutetium(III) acetylacetonate molecule, the acetylacetonate anion acts as a ligand to coordinate with lutetium(III)

Trivalent lutetium and water can form complex ions such as [Lu(OH_{2})_{n}]^{3+}, and lutetium(III) perchlorate and lutetium(III) trifluoromethanesulfonate can exist in the form of hydrates. Ether (R_{2}O) is also a common oxygen-containing ligand. For example, Lu(CH_{2}SiMe_{3})_{3}(THF)_{2} can be obtained by reacting lutetium(III) chloride and (trimethylsilyl)methyllithium in a solvent containing tetrahydrofuran (THF).

== Other compounds ==
Adding ammonia water or a hydroxide to the aqueous solution of any soluble lutetium salt can precipitate lutetium(III) hydroxide (Lu(OH)_{3}). The hexagonal lutetium hydroxide can be heated and dehydrated to obtain the monoclinic lutetium oxyhydroxide (LuO(OH)), and further heating will make it decompose into lutetium(III) oxide (Lu_{2}O_{3}). Lutetium oxyhalides (LuOX, X=Cl, Br, I) can be obtained by hydrolysis of the lutetium trihalides. Lu_{2}Cl_{2}C can be obtained by reacting lutetium(III) chloride, caesium chloride, lutetium and carbon at a high temperature.
