= Armstrongite =

Phyllosilicate mineral

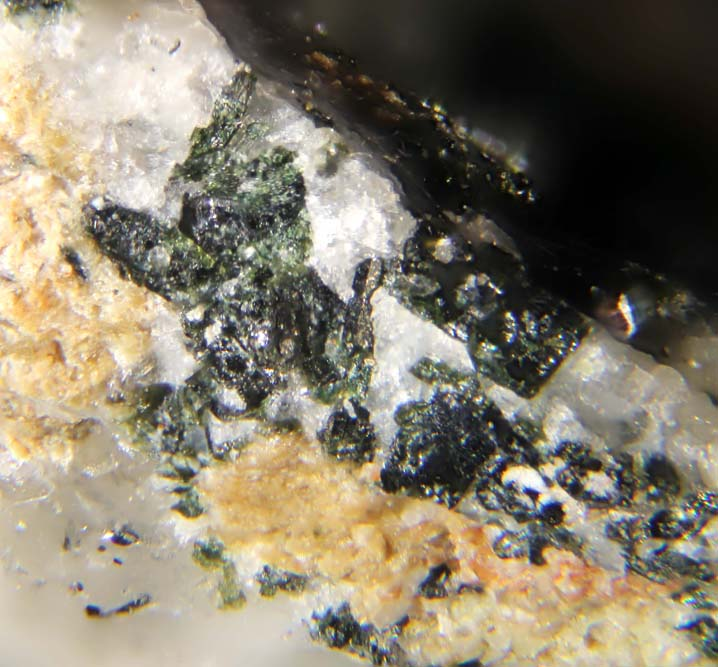
- Armstrongite found in Mongolia

General
- Category: Phyllosilicate minerals
- Formula: CaZr[Si_{6}O_{15}]·3H_{2}O
- IMA symbol: Asg
- Strunz classification: 9.EA.35
- Crystal system: Monoclinic

Identification
- Color: Dark to light brown
- Cleavage: Perfect on {001}, good on {100}
- Tenacity: Very brittle
- Mohs scale hardness: 4.5
- Luster: Vitreous
- Streak: Brownish white
- Diaphaneity: Translucent

Armstrongite (CaZr[Si_{6}O_{15}]·3H_{2}O) is a silicate mineral.

== Discovery and occurrence ==
It was first described in 1973 from an occurrence at Dorozhnyi pegmatite, Khanbogd District, Ömnögovi Province, Mongolia. It was named for the American astronaut Neil Armstrong.
