= Hafnium(IV) silicate =

Names
- Preferred IUPAC name Hafnium(IV) silicate
- Systematic IUPAC name Hafnium(4+) silicate

Identifiers
CAS Number	13870-13-8
3D model (JSmol)	Interactive image
ChemSpider	16470992
PubChem CID	17979268
CompTox Dashboard (EPA)	DTXSID901026773
- InChI: InChI=1S/Hf.O4Si/c;1-5(2,3)4/q+4;-4 Key: VCFZGYGRRNTEGX-UHFFFAOYSA-N
- SMILES: [Hf+4].[O-][Si]([O-])([O-])[O-]

Properties
Chemical formula	HfO_{4}Si
Molar mass	270.57 g·mol^{−1}
Appearance	Tetragonal crystal
Density	7.0 g/cm^{3}
Melting point	2,758 °C (4,996 °F; 3,031 K)
- Except where otherwise noted, data are given for materials in their standard state (at 25 °C [77 °F], 100 kPa). Infobox references

Hafnium silicate is the hafnium(IV) salt of silicic acid with the chemical formula of HfSiO_{4}.

Thin films of hafnium silicate and zirconium silicate grown by atomic layer deposition, chemical vapor deposition or MOCVD, can be used as a high-κ dielectric as a replacement for silicon dioxide in modern semiconductor devices. The addition of silicon to hafnium oxide increases the band gap, while decreasing the dielectric constant. Furthermore, it increases the crystallization temperature of amorphous films and further increases the material's thermal stability with Si at high temperatures. Nitrogen is sometimes added to hafnium silicate for improving the thermal stability and electrical properties of devices.

== Natural occurrence ==
Hafnon is the natural form of hafnium orthosilicate. Its name suggests the mineral is the Hf analogue of much more common zircon. Hafnon is the only currently known confirmed mineral of hafnium (i.e., hafnium-dominant one). Hafnon and zircon form a solid solution. Hafnon is a solely pegmatitic mineral and it occurs in largely fractionated (complex-genesis/history) pegmatites.
