= Hafnium tetrabromide =

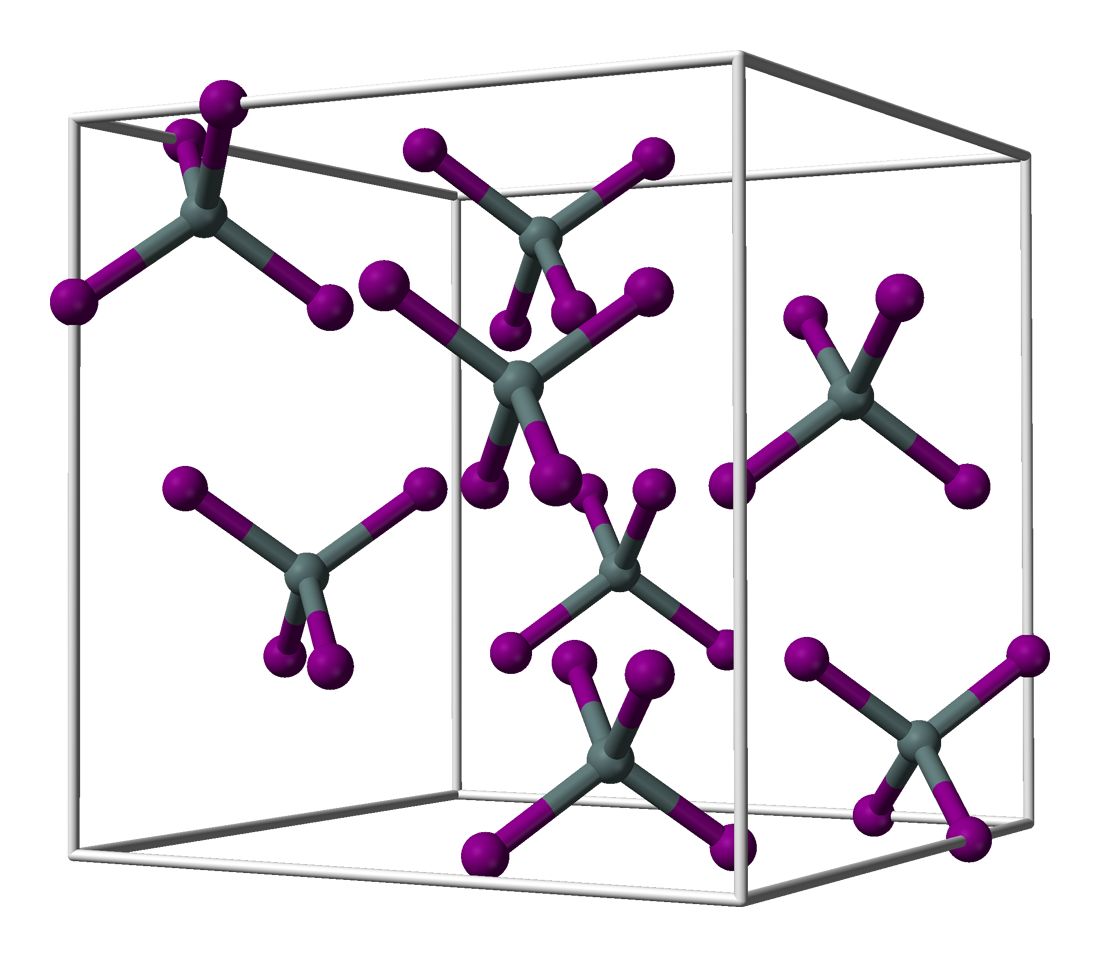
- Hafnium tetrabromide

Identifiers
CAS Number	13777-22-5
3D model (JSmol)	Interactive image
ChemSpider	75547
ECHA InfoCard	100.034.001
EC Number	237-416-9
PubChem CID	83725
CompTox Dashboard (EPA)	DTXSID2065628
- InChI: InChI=1S/4BrH.Hf/h4*1H;/q;;;;+4/p-4 Key: FEEFWFYISQGDKK-UHFFFAOYSA-J
- SMILES: Br[Hf](Br)(Br)Br

Properties
Chemical formula	Br_{4}Hf
Appearance	colorless solid
Density	5.094 g/cm^{3}

Hazards
- GHS labelling
Pictograms	(GHS05: Corrosive)
Signal word	Danger
Hazard statements	H314
Precautionary statements	P260, P264, P280, P301+P330+P331, P303+P361+P353, P304+P340, P305+P351+P338, P310, P321, P363, P405, P501
- Except where otherwise noted, data are given for materials in their standard state (at 25 °C [77 °F], 100 kPa). Infobox references

Hafnium tetrabromide is the inorganic compound with the formula HfBr_{4}. It is the most common bromide of hafnium. It is a colorless, diamagnetic moisture sensitive solid that sublimes in vacuum. It adopts a structure very similar to that of zirconium tetrabromide, featuring tetrahedral Hf centers, in contrast to the polymeric nature of hafnium tetrachloride.
