= Hafnium tetrafluoride =

Hafnium(IV) fluoride
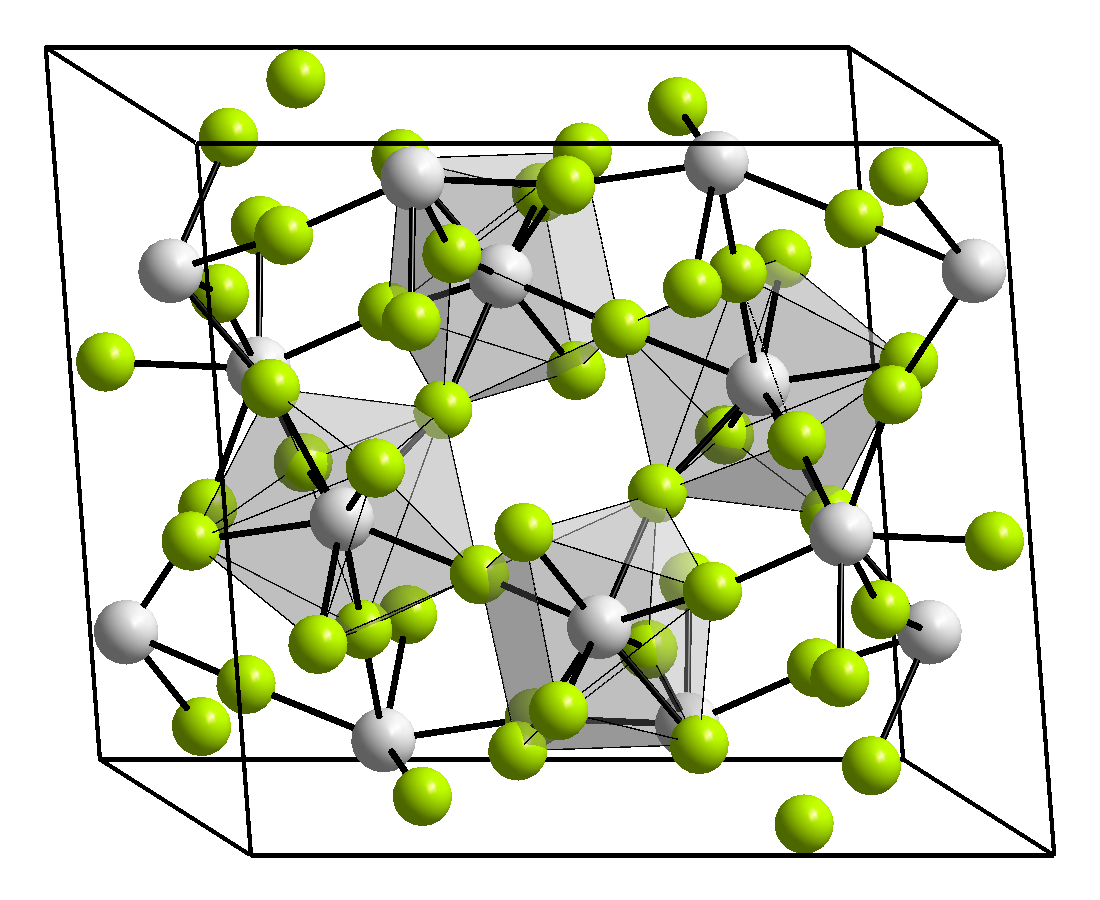
- Zirconium(IV) fluoride

Names
- IUPAC names Hafnium(IV) fluoride Hafnium tetrafluoride

Identifiers
CAS Number	13709-52-9
3D model (JSmol)	Interactive image
ChemSpider	3306631
ECHA InfoCard	100.033.856
EC Number	237-258-0
PubChem CID	50925283
CompTox Dashboard (EPA)	DTXSID30929710
- InChI: InChI=1S/4FH.Hf/h4*1H;/q;;;;+4/p-4 Key: QHEDSQMUHIMDOL-UHFFFAOYSA-J
- SMILES: [F-].[F-].[F-].[F-].[Hf+4]

Properties
Chemical formula	HfF_{4}
Appearance	white crystalline powder
Density	7.1 g/cm^{3}
Boiling point	970 °C (1,780 °F; 1,240 K) (sublimes)

Structure
Crystal structure	Monoclinic, mS60
Space group	C2/c, No. 15
Lattice constant	a = 1.17 nm, b = 0.986 nm, c = 0.764 nm

Hazards
Flash point	Non-flammable

Related compounds
Other anions	Hafnium(IV) chloride
Other cations	Titanium(IV) fluoride
- Except where otherwise noted, data are given for materials in their standard state (at 25 °C [77 °F], 100 kPa). verify (what is ?) Infobox references

Hafnium tetrafluoride is the inorganic compound with the formula HfF_{4}. It is a white solid. It adopts the same structure as zirconium tetrafluoride, with 8-coordinate Hf(IV) centers.

Hafnium tetrafluoride forms a trihydrate, which has a polymeric structure consisting of octahedral Hf center, described as (μ−F)_{2}[HfF_{2}(H_{2}O)_{2}]_{n}(H_{2}O)_{n} and one water of crystallization. In a rare case where the chemistry of Hf and Zr differ, the trihydrate of zirconium(IV) fluoride has a molecular structure (μ−F)_{2}[ZrF_{3}(H_{2}O)_{3}]_{2}, without the lattice water.
