= Hafnium =

Hafnium, _{72}Hf
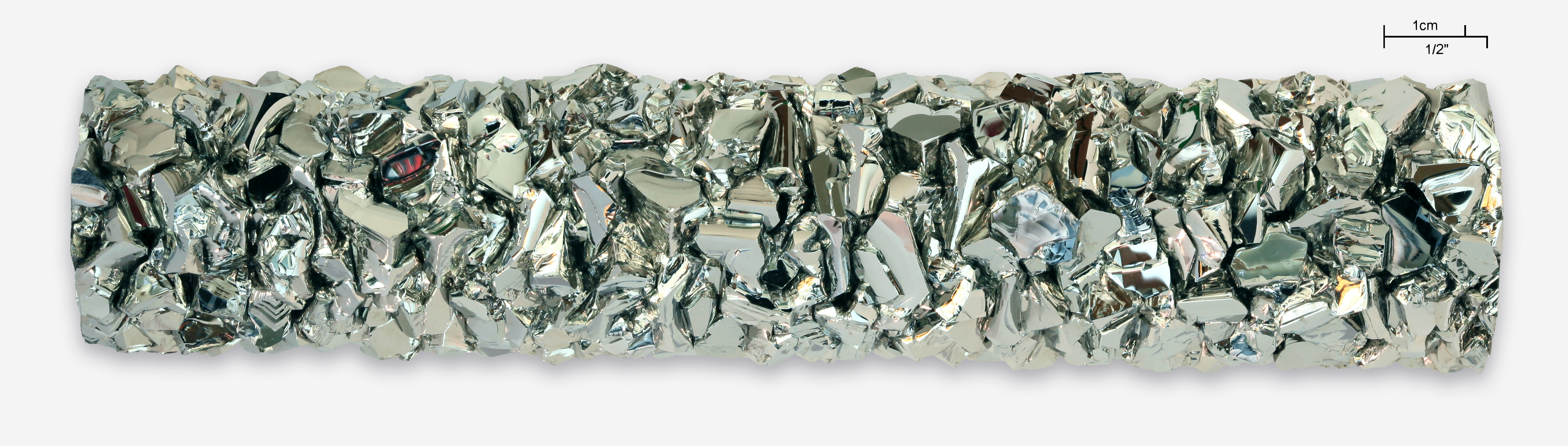

Hafnium
- Pronunciation: /ˈhæfniəm/ (HAF-nee-əm)
- Appearance: steel gray

Standard atomic weight A_{r}°(Hf)
- 178.486±0.006; 178.49±0.01 (abridged)

Hafnium in the periodic table
Hydrogen																															Helium
Lithium	Beryllium																									Boron	Carbon	Nitrogen	Oxygen	Fluorine	Neon
Sodium	Magnesium																									Aluminium	Silicon	Phosphorus	Sulfur	Chlorine	Argon
Potassium	Calcium															Scandium	Titanium	Vanadium	Chromium	Manganese	Iron	Cobalt	Nickel	Copper	Zinc	Gallium	Germanium	Arsenic	Selenium	Bromine	Krypton
Rubidium	Strontium															Yttrium	Zirconium	Niobium	Molybdenum	Technetium	Ruthenium	Rhodium	Palladium	Silver	Cadmium	Indium	Tin	Antimony	Tellurium	Iodine	Xenon
Caesium	Barium	Lanthanum	Cerium	Praseodymium	Neodymium	Promethium	Samarium	Europium	Gadolinium	Terbium	Dysprosium	Holmium	Erbium	Thulium	Ytterbium	Lutetium	Hafnium	Tantalum	Tungsten	Rhenium	Osmium	Iridium	Platinum	Gold	Mercury (element)	Thallium	Lead	Bismuth	Polonium	Astatine	Radon
Francium	Radium	Actinium	Thorium	Protactinium	Uranium	Neptunium	Plutonium	Americium	Curium	Berkelium	Californium	Einsteinium	Fermium	Mendelevium	Nobelium	Lawrencium	Rutherfordium	Dubnium	Seaborgium	Bohrium	Hassium	Meitnerium	Darmstadtium	Roentgenium	Copernicium	Nihonium	Flerovium	Moscovium	Livermorium	Tennessine	Oganesson
Zr
↑
Hf
↓
Rf
lutetium ← hafnium → tantalum
- Atomic number (Z): 72
- Group: group 4
- Period: period 6
- Block: d-block
- Electron configuration: [Xe] 4f^{14} 5d^{2} 6s^{2}
- Electrons per shell: 2, 8, 18, 32, 10, 2

Physical properties
- Phase at STP: solid
- Melting point: 2506 K (2233 °C, 4051 °F)
- Boiling point: 4876 K (4603 °C, 8317 °F)
- Density (at 20° C): 13.281 g/cm^{3}
- when liquid (at m.p.): 12 g/cm^{3}
- Heat of fusion: 27.2 kJ/mol
- Heat of vaporization: 648 kJ/mol
- Molar heat capacity: 25.73 J/(mol·K)
- Specific heat capacity: 144.154 J/(kg·K)
Vapor pressure
P (Pa)	1	10	100	1 k	10 k	100 k
at T (K)	2689	2954	3277	3679	4194	4876

Atomic properties
- Oxidation states: common: +4 −2, 0, +1, +2, +3
- Electronegativity: Pauling scale: 1.3
- Ionization energies: 1st: 658.5 kJ/mol; 2nd: 1440 kJ/mol; 3rd: 2250 kJ/mol
- Atomic radius: empirical: 159 pm
- Covalent radius: 175±10 pm
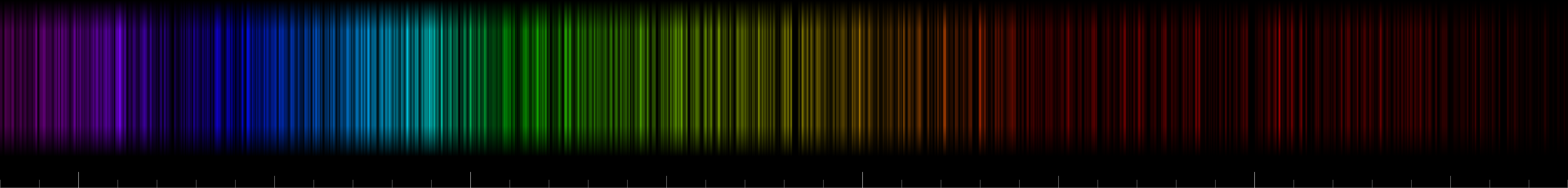
- Spectral lines of hafnium

Other properties
- Natural occurrence: primordial
- Crystal structure: hexagonal close-packed (hcp) (hP2)
- Lattice constants: a = 319.42 pm c = 505.12 pm (at 20 °C)
- Thermal expansion: 5.9 µm/(m⋅K) (at 25 °C)
- Thermal conductivity: 23.0 W/(m⋅K)
- Electrical resistivity: 331 nΩ⋅m (at 20 °C)
- Magnetic ordering: paramagnetic
- Molar magnetic susceptibility: +75.0×10^{−6} cm^{3}/mol (at 298 K)
- Young's modulus: 78 GPa
- Shear modulus: 30 GPa
- Bulk modulus: 110 GPa
- Speed of sound thin rod: 3010 m/s (at 20 °C)
- Poisson ratio: 0.37
- Mohs hardness: 5.5
- Vickers hardness: 1520–2060 MPa
- Brinell hardness: 1450–2100 MPa
- CAS Number: 7440-58-6

History
- Naming: after Hafnia. Latin for: Copenhagen, where it was discovered
- Prediction: Dmitri Mendeleev (1869)
- Discovery and first isolation: Dirk Coster and George de Hevesy (1922)

Isotopes of hafnium
Main isotopes			Decay	
Isotope	abundance	half-life (t_{1/2})	mode	product
^{172}Hf	synth	1.87 y	ε	^{172}Lu
^{174}Hf	0.16%	3.8×10^{16} y	α	^{170}Yb
^{175}Hf	synth	69.90 d	ε	^{175}Lu
^{176}Hf	5.26%	stable		
^{177}Hf	18.60%	stable		
^{178}Hf	27.28%	stable		
^{178m2}Hf	synth	31 y	IT	^{178}Hf
^{179}Hf	13.62%	stable		
^{180}Hf	35.08%	stable		
^{181}Hf	synth	42.39 d	β^{−}	^{181}Ta
^{182}Hf	synth	8.90×10^{6} y	β^{−}	^{182}Ta

Hafnium is a chemical element; it has symbol Hf and atomic number 72. A lustrous, silvery gray, tetravalent transition metal, hafnium chemically resembles zirconium and is found in many zirconium minerals. Its existence was predicted by Dmitri Mendeleev in 1869, though it was not identified until 1922, by Dirk Coster and George de Hevesy. Hafnium is named after Hafnia, the Latin name for Copenhagen, where it was discovered. The element is obtained only by separation from zirconium, with most of the world's hafnium production coming from processes that also produce zirconium. These processes make use of heavy mineral sands ore deposits, which include the minerals zircon, rutile, and ilmenite, among others.

Hafnium is most often used in alloys with nickel, and was used in larger quantities to produce the control rods used in nuclear reactors. Hafnium's large neutron capture cross section makes it a good material for neutron absorption in control rods in nuclear power plants, but at the same time requires that it be removed from the neutron-transparent corrosion-resistant zirconium alloys used in nuclear reactors. It is ductile, and is also used in filaments and electrodes. Some semiconductor fabrication processes use its oxide for integrated circuits at 45 nanometres (1.8×10^{−6} in) and smaller, and superalloys used for special applications can contain hafnium in combination with niobium, titanium, or tungsten.

Pure hafnium is not toxic, but is extremely flammable to the point of being pyrophoric—capable of spontaneous combustion in air. Several industrial processes involved in the production of hafnium have by-products that can be hazardous when released into the environment, and several hafnium compounds have hazards of their own. One nuclear isomer of hafnium, ^{178m2}Hf, was the source of a controversy for its potential use as a weapon, but it has never been successfully produced for practical use.

== Characteristics ==
=== Physical characteristics ===
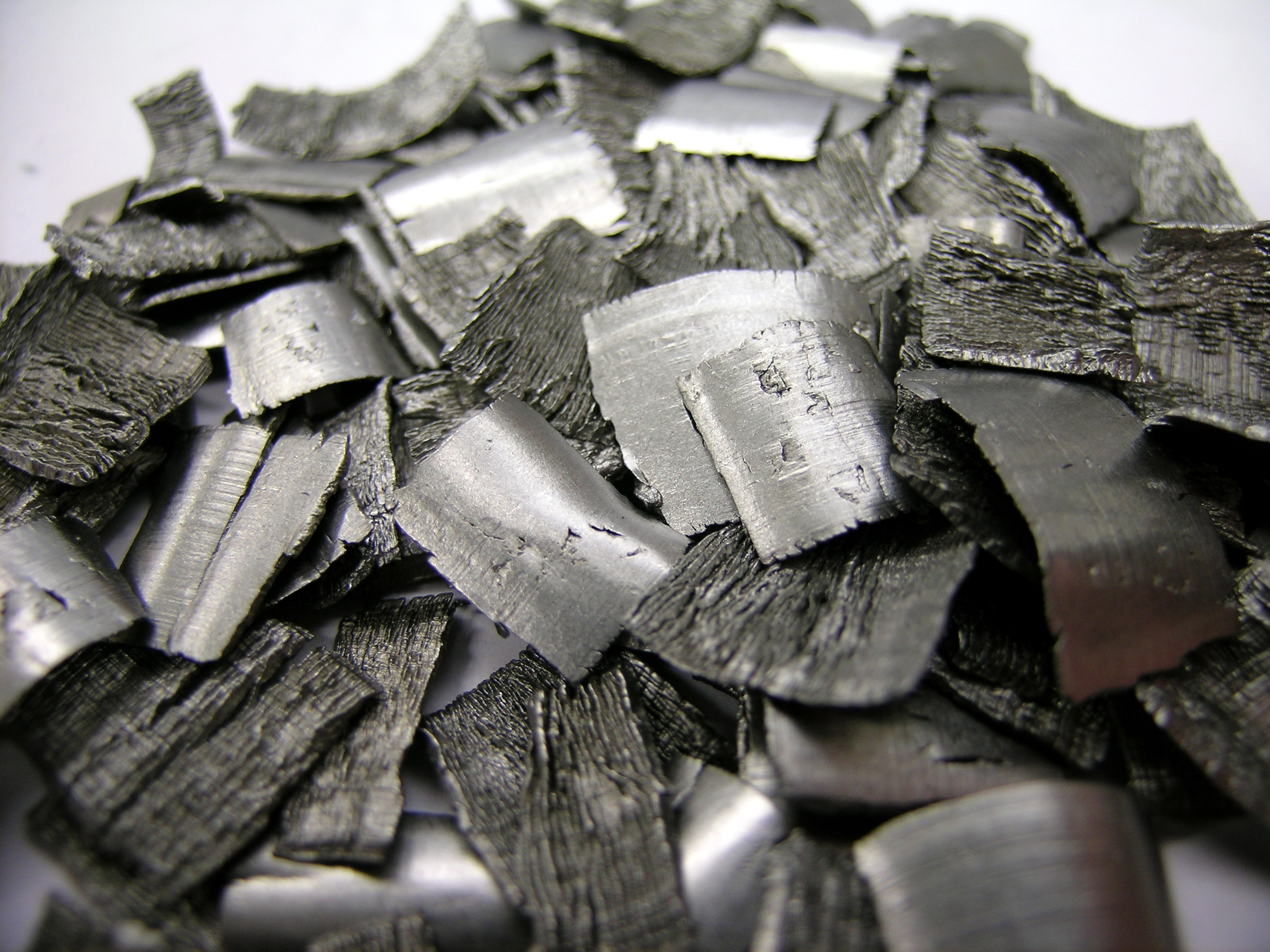
Pieces of hafnium

Hafnium is a shiny, silvery, ductile metal that is corrosion-resistant and chemically similar to zirconium in that they have the same number of valence electrons and are in the same group. Also, their relativistic effects are similar: The expected expansion of atomic radii from period 5 to 6 is almost exactly canceled out by the lanthanide contraction. Hafnium changes from its alpha form, a hexagonal close-packed lattice, to its beta form, a body-centered cubic lattice, at 2,388 K (2,115 °C; 3,839 °F). The physical properties of hafnium metal samples are markedly affected by zirconium impurities, especially the nuclear properties, as these two elements are among the most difficult to separate because of their chemical similarity.

A notable physical difference between these metals is their density, with zirconium having about one-half the density of hafnium. The most notable nuclear properties of hafnium are its high thermal neutron capture cross section, roughly three orders of magnitude greater than that of zirconium, and that the nuclei of several different hafnium isotopes readily absorb two or more neutrons apiece. Because zirconium is practically transparent to thermal neutrons, it is commonly used for the metal components of nuclear reactors—especially the cladding of their nuclear fuel rods.

=== Chemical characteristics ===
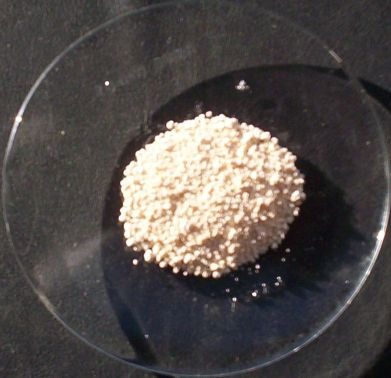
Hafnium dioxide (HfO_{2})

Hafnium reacts in air to form a protective film of hafnium oxide in the monoclinic phase that inhibits further corrosion. Despite this, the metal is attacked by hydrofluoric acid and concentrated sulfuric acid, and can be oxidized with halogens or burnt in air. Like its sister metal zirconium, finely divided hafnium can ignite spontaneously in air. The metal is resistant to concentrated alkalis.

As a consequence of lanthanide contraction, the chemistry of hafnium and zirconium is so similar that the two cannot be separated based on differing chemical reactions. The melting and boiling points of the compounds and the solubility in solvents are the major differences in the chemistry of these twin elements.

=== Isotopes ===
At least 40 isotopes of hafnium have been observed, ranging in mass number from 153 to 192. The five stable isotopes have mass numbers from 176 to 180 inclusive; the primordial ^{174}Hf has a very long half-life of 3.8×10^{16} years.

The extinct radionuclide ^{182}Hf has a half-life of 8.90 million years, and is an important tracker isotope for the formation of planetary cores. No other radioisotope has a half-life over 1.87 years.

The longest-lived nuclear isomer ^{178m2}Hf (31 years) was at the center of a controversy for several years regarding its potential use as a weapon. Because of its high energy compared to the ground state ^{178}Hf, the isomer was put under scrutiny as being capable of induced gamma emission, which could be weaponized to produce large amounts of gamma radiation all at once. Applications of the isomer have been frustrated due to the difficulty of producing it without the product being immediately destroyed as well as its extremely high cost.

=== Occurrence ===
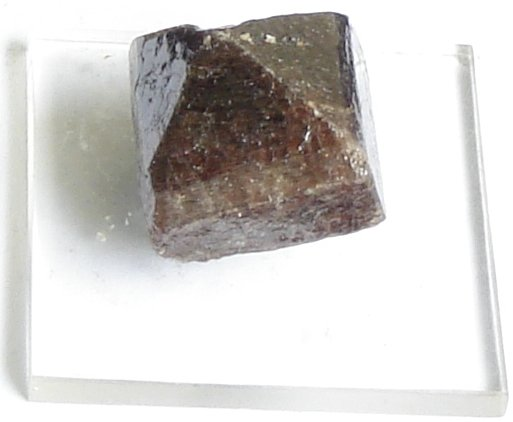
Zircon crystal (2×2 cm) from Tocantins, Brazil

Hafnium is estimated to make up about between 3.0 and 4.8 ppm of the Earth's upper crust by mass. It does not exist as a free element on Earth, but is found combined in solid solution with zirconium in natural zirconium compounds such as zircon, ZrSiO_{4}, which usually has about 1–4 % of the Zr replaced by Hf. Rarely, the Hf/Zr ratio increases during crystallization to give the isostructural mineral hafnon (Hf,Zr)SiO_{4}, with atomic Hf > Zr. An obsolete name for a variety of zircon containing unusually high Hf content is alvite.

A major source of zircon (and hence hafnium) ores is heavy mineral sands ore deposits, pegmatites, particularly in Brazil and Malawi, and carbonatite intrusions, particularly the Crown Polymetallic Deposit at Mount Weld, Western Australia. A potential source of hafnium is trachyte tuffs containing rare zircon-hafnium silicates eudialyte or armstrongite, at Dubbo in New South Wales, Australia.

== Production ==
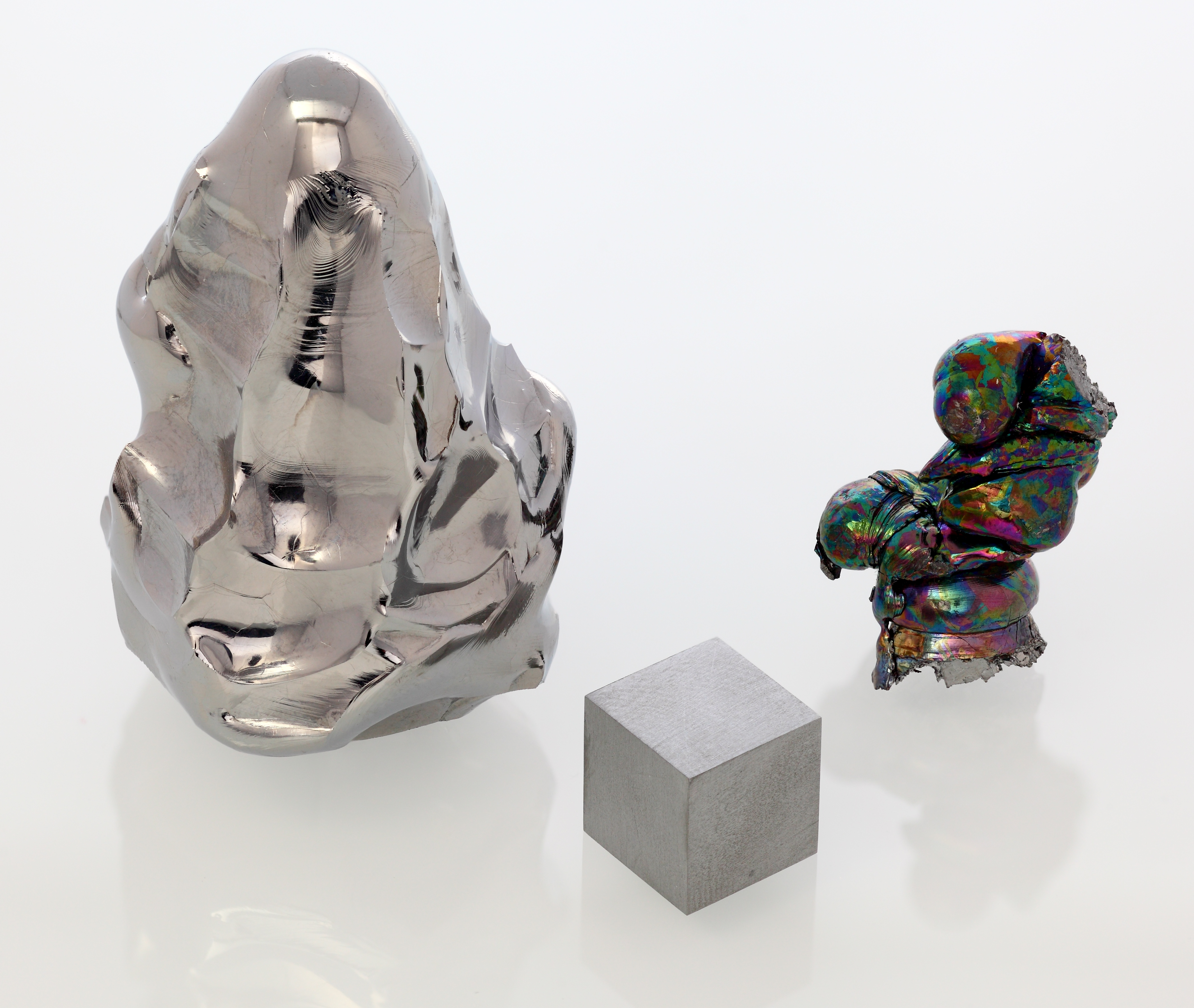
Melted tip of a hafnium consumable electrode used in an electron beam remelting furnace, a 1 cm cube, and an oxidized hafnium electron beam-remelted ingot (left to right)

The heavy mineral sands ore deposits of the titanium ores ilmenite and rutile yield most of the mined zirconium, and therefore also most of the hafnium. Zirconium is a good nuclear fuel-rod cladding metal, with the desirable properties of a very low neutron capture cross section and good chemical stability at high temperatures. However, because of hafnium's neutron-absorbing properties, hafnium impurities in zirconium would cause it to be far less useful for nuclear reactor applications. Thus, a nearly complete separation of zirconium and hafnium is necessary for their use in nuclear power. The production of hafnium-free zirconium is the main source of hafnium.

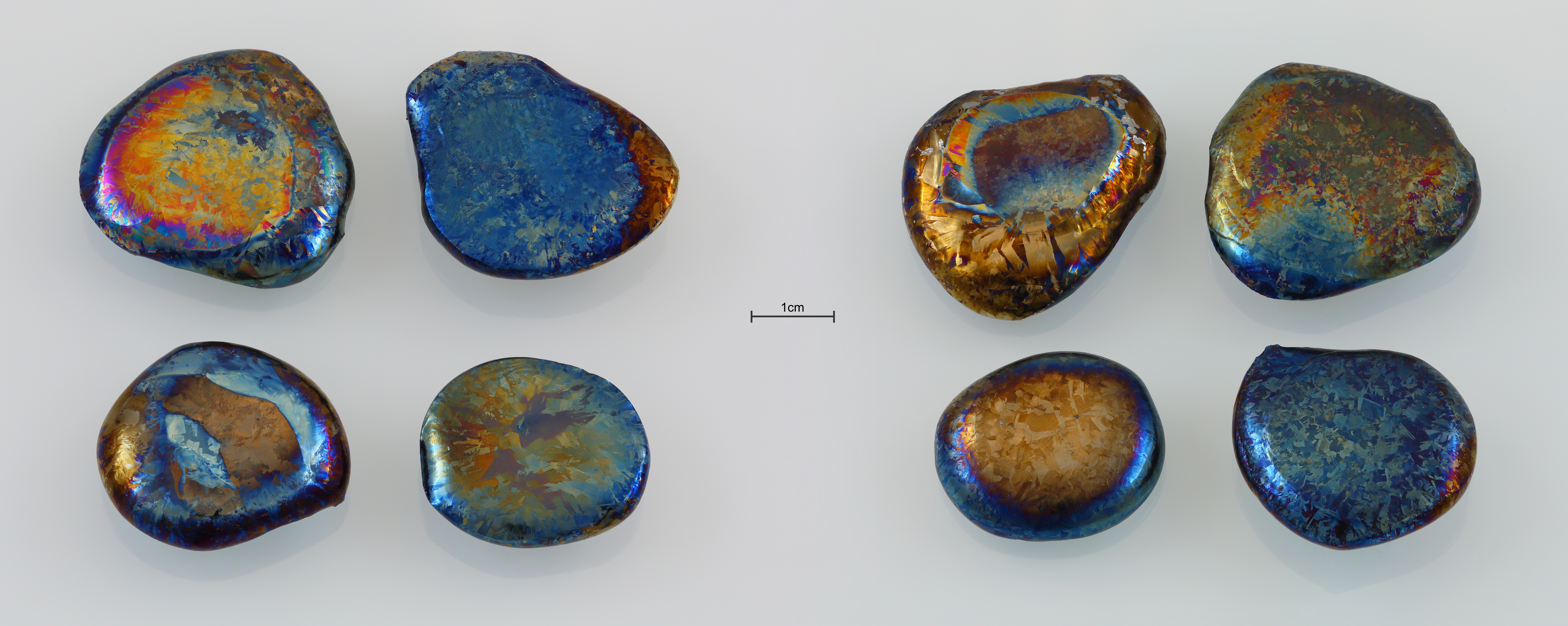
Hafnium oxidized ingots exhibiting thin-film interference

The chemical properties of hafnium and zirconium are nearly identical, which makes the two difficult to separate. The methods first used—fractional crystallization of ammonium fluoride salts or the fractional distillation of the chloride—did not prove suitable for an industrial-scale production. After zirconium was chosen as a material for nuclear reactor programs in the 1940s, a separation method had to be developed. Liquid–liquid extraction processes with a wide variety of solvents were developed and are still used for producing hafnium. Other methods to purify hafnium from zirconium include molten salt extraction and crystallization of fluorozirconates. About half of all hafnium metal manufactured is produced as a by-product of zirconium refinement. The end product of the separation is hafnium(IV) chloride. The purified hafnium(IV) chloride is converted to the metal by reduction with magnesium or sodium, as in the Kroll process.

$$\ce{HfCl4{} + 2 Mg ->[1100~^\circ\text{C}] Hf{} + 2 MgCl2}$$

Further purification is effected by a chemical transport reaction developed by Arkel and de Boer: In a closed vessel, hafnium reacts with iodine at temperatures of 500 °C (900 °F), forming hafnium(IV) iodide; at a tungsten filament of 1,700 °C (3,100 °F) the reverse reaction happens preferentially, and the chemically bound iodine and hafnium dissociate into the native elements. The hafnium forms a solid coating at the tungsten filament, and the iodine can react with additional hafnium, resulting in a steady iodine turnover and ensuring the chemical equilibrium remains in favor of hafnium production.

$$\ce{Hf{} + 2 I2 ->[500~^\circ\text{C}] HfI4}$$
$$\ce{HfI4 ->[1700~^\circ\text{C}] Hf{} + 2 I2}$$

== Chemical compounds ==
Due to the lanthanide contraction, the ionic radius of hafnium(IV) (0.78 ångström) is almost the same as that of zirconium(IV) (0.79 angstroms). Consequently, compounds of hafnium(IV) and zirconium(IV) have very similar chemical and physical properties. Hafnium and zirconium tend to occur together in nature and the similarity of their ionic radii makes their chemical separation rather difficult. Hafnium tends to form inorganic compounds in the oxidation state of +4. Halogens react with it to form hafnium tetrahalides. At higher temperatures, hafnium reacts with oxygen, nitrogen, carbon, boron, sulfur, and silicon. Some hafnium compounds in lower oxidation states are known.

Hafnium(IV) chloride and hafnium(IV) iodide have some applications in the production and purification of hafnium metal. They are volatile solids with polymeric structures. These tetrahalides are precursors to various organohafnium compounds, and hafnium(IV) chloride in particular is used in microelectronics manufacturing as a source of hafnium oxide in atomic layer deposition, much in the same way as zirconium(IV) chloride.

The white hafnium oxide (HfO_{2}), with a melting point of 2,812 °C (3,085 K; 5,094 °F) and a boiling point of roughly 5,100 °C (5,400 K; 9,200 °F), is very similar to zirconia, but slightly more basic. Hafnium carbide is the most refractory binary compound known, with a melting point over 3,890 °C (4,163 K; 7,034 °F), and hafnium nitride is the most refractory of all known metal nitrides, with a melting point of 3,310 °C (3,583 K; 5,990 °F). Hafnium carbonitride has the highest known melting point for any material, which is confirmed to be above 4,000 °C (4,270 K; 7,230 °F) by experiment, while calculations predict its melting point to be 4,110 °C (4,380 K; 7,430 °F).

== History ==
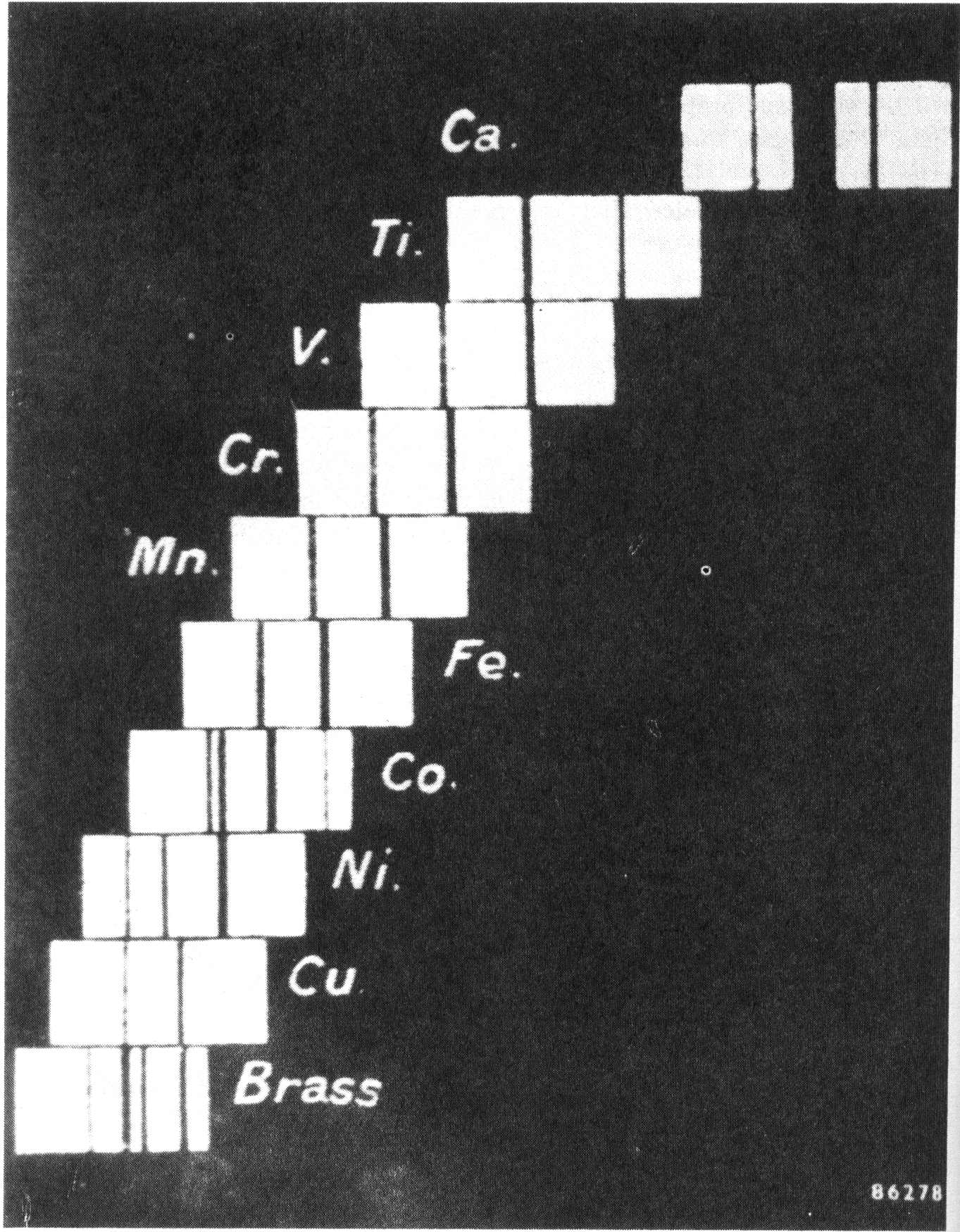
Photographic recording of the characteristic X-ray emission lines of some elements

Hafnium's existence was predicted by Dmitri Mendeleev in 1869. In his report on The Periodic Law of the Chemical Elements, in 1869, Mendeleev had implicitly predicted the existence of a heavier analog of titanium and zirconium. At the time of his formulation in 1871, Mendeleev believed that the elements were ordered by their atomic masses and placed lanthanum (element 57) in the spot below zirconium. The exact placement of the elements and the location of missing elements was done by determining the specific weight of the elements and comparing the chemical and physical properties.

The X-ray spectroscopy done by Henry Moseley in 1914 showed a direct dependency between spectral line and effective nuclear charge. This led to the nuclear charge, or atomic number of an element, being used to ascertain its place within the periodic table. With this method, Moseley determined the number of lanthanides and showed the gaps in the atomic number sequence at numbers 43, 61, 72, and 75.

The discovery of the gaps led to an extensive search for the missing elements. In 1914, several people claimed the discovery after Henry Moseley predicted the gap in the periodic table for the then-undiscovered element 72. Georges Urbain asserted that he found element 72 in the rare earth elements in 1907 and published his results on celtium in 1911. Neither the spectra nor the chemical behavior he claimed matched with the element found later, and therefore his claim was turned down after a long-standing controversy. The controversy was partly because the chemists favored the chemical techniques which led to the discovery of celtium, while the physicists relied on the use of the new X-ray spectroscopy method that proved that the substances discovered by Urbain did not contain element 72. In 1921, Charles R. Bury suggested that element 72 should resemble zirconium and therefore was not part of the rare earth elements group. By early 1923, Niels Bohr and others agreed with Bury. These suggestions were based on Bohr's theories of the atom which were identical to chemist Charles Bury, the X-ray spectroscopy of Moseley, and the chemical arguments of Friedrich Paneth.

Encouraged by these suggestions and by the reappearance in 1922 of Urbain's claims that element 72 was a rare earth element discovered in 1911, Dirk Coster and Georg von Hevesy were motivated to search for the new element in zirconium ores. Hafnium was discovered by the two in 1923 in Copenhagen, Denmark, validating the original 1869 prediction of Mendeleev. It was ultimately found in zircon in Norway through X-ray spectroscopy analysis. The place where the discovery took place led to the element being named for the Latin name for "Copenhagen", Hafnia, the home town of Niels Bohr. Today, the Faculty of Science of the University of Copenhagen uses in its seal a stylized image of the hafnium atom.

Hafnium was separated from zirconium through repeated recrystallization of the double ammonium or potassium fluorides by Valdemar Thal Jantzen and von Hevesey. Anton Eduard van Arkel and Jan Hendrik de Boer were the first to prepare metallic hafnium by passing hafnium tetraiodide vapor over a heated tungsten filament in 1924. This process for differential purification of zirconium and hafnium is still in use today.

In 1923, six predicted elements were still missing from the periodic table: 43 (technetium), 61 (promethium), 85 (astatine), and 87 (francium) are radioactive elements and are only present in trace amounts in the environment, thus making elements 75 (rhenium) and 72 (hafnium) the last two stable elements to be discovered. The element rhenium was found in 1908 by Masataka Ogawa, though its atomic number was misidentified at the time, and it was not generally recognised by the scientific community until its rediscovery by Walter Noddack, Ida Noddack, and Otto Berg in 1925. This makes it somewhat difficult to say if hafnium or rhenium was discovered last.

== Applications ==
Much of the hafnium produced is used in the manufacture of control rods for nuclear reactors and as an additive in nickel alloys to increase their heat resistance.

Hafnium has limited technical applications due to a few factors. It is very similar to zirconium, a more abundant element that can be used in most cases, and pure hafnium was not widely available until the late 1950s, when it became a byproduct of the nuclear industry's need for hafnium-free zirconium. Additionally, hafnium is rare and difficult to separate from other elements, making it expensive. After the Fukushima disaster reduced the demand for hafnium-free zirconium, the price of hafnium increased significantly from around $500–600/kg ($227–272/lb) in 2014 to around $1000/kg ($454/lb) in 2015. Hafnium products, such as tubes and sheets of the metal, could be purchased at €250/kg ($170/lb) in 2009.

=== Nuclear reactors ===
The nuclei of several hafnium isotopes can each absorb multiple neutrons. This makes hafnium a good material for nuclear reactors' control rods. Its neutron capture cross section (Capture Resonance Integral I_{o} ≈ 2000 barns) is about 600 times that of zirconium (other elements that are good neutron-absorbers for control rods are cadmium and boron). Excellent mechanical properties and exceptional corrosion-resistance properties allow its use in the harsh environment of pressurized water reactors. The German research reactor FRM II uses hafnium as a neutron absorber. It is also common in military reactors, particularly in US naval submarine reactors, to slow reactor rates that are too high. It is seldom found in civilian reactors, the first core of the Shippingport Atomic Power Station (a conversion of a naval reactor) being a notable exception.

=== Alloys ===
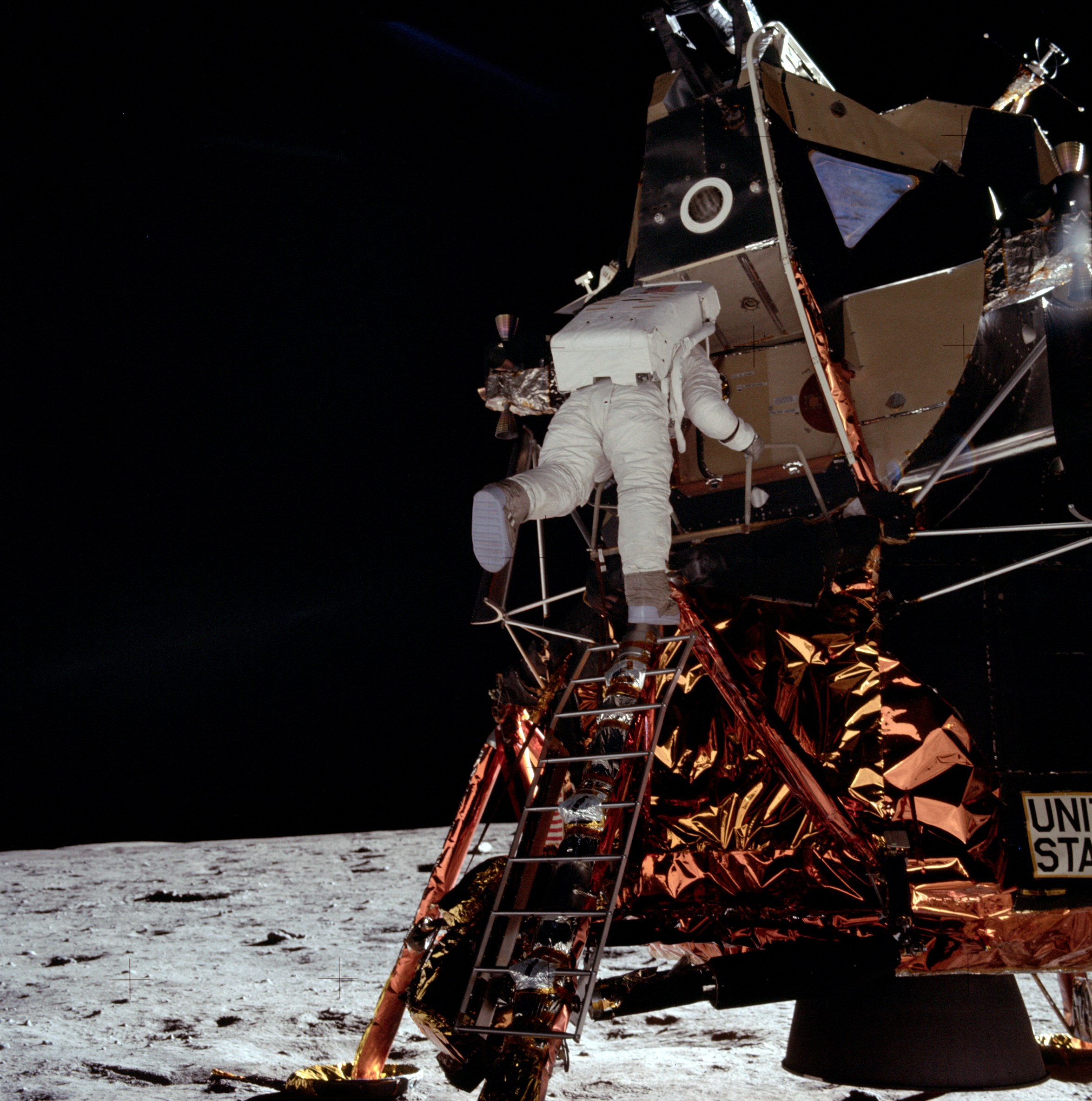
Hafnium-containing rocket nozzle of the Apollo Lunar Module in the lower right corner

Hafnium is used in alloys with iron, titanium, niobium, tantalum, and other metals. An alloy used for liquid-rocket thruster nozzles, for example the main engine of the Apollo Lunar Modules, is C103 which consists of 89 % niobium, 10 % hafnium and 1 % titanium.

Small additions of hafnium increase the adherence of protective oxide scales on nickel-based alloys. It thereby improves the corrosion resistance, especially under cyclic temperature conditions that tend to break oxide scales, by inducing thermal stresses between the bulk material and the oxide layer. An alloy that includes as little as 1 % hafnium can withstand temperatures that are 50 °C (90 °F) higher than the same alloy without hafnium.

=== Microprocessors ===
Hafnium-based compounds are employed in gates of transistors as insulators in the 45 nm (and below) generation of integrated circuits from Intel, IBM and others. Hafnium oxide-based compounds are practical high-κ dielectrics, allowing reduction of the gate leakage current which improves performance at such scales.

=== Isotope geochemistry ===
Isotopes of hafnium and lutetium are also used in isotope geochemistry and geochronological applications, in lutetium-hafnium dating. It is often used as a tracer of isotopic evolution of Earth's mantle through time. This is because ^{176}Lu decays to ^{176}Hf with a half-life of approximately 37 billion years.

In most geologic materials, zircon is the dominant host of hafnium (>10,000 ppm) and is often the focus of hafnium studies in geology. Hafnium is readily substituted into the zircon crystal lattice, and is therefore very resistant to hafnium mobility and contamination. Zircon also has an extremely low Lu/Hf ratio, making any correction for initial lutetium minimal. Although the Lu/Hf system can be used to calculate a "model age", i.e. the time at which it was derived from a given isotopic reservoir such as the depleted mantle, these "ages" do not carry the same geologic significance as do other geochronological techniques as the results often yield isotopic mixtures and thus provide an average age of the material from which it was derived.

Garnet is another mineral that contains appreciable amounts of hafnium to act as a geochronometer. The high and variable Lu/Hf ratios found in garnet make it useful for dating metamorphic events. Mass spectrometry also makes use of these ratios to date garnet formed through igneous events.

=== Other uses ===
Due to its heat resistance and its affinity to oxygen and nitrogen, hafnium is a good scavenger for oxygen and nitrogen in gas-filled and incandescent lamps. Hafnium is also used as the electrode in plasma cutting because of its ability to shed electrons into the air. Hafnium metallocene compounds can be prepared from hafnium tetrachloride and various cyclopentadiene-type ligand species. Perhaps the simplest hafnium metallocene is hafnocene dichloride. Hafnium metallocenes are part of a large collection of Group 4 transition metal metallocene catalysts that are used worldwide in the production of polyolefin resins like polyethylene and polypropylene. A pyridyl-amidohafnium catalyst can be used for the controlled iso-selective polymerization of propylene, which can then be combined with polyethylene to make a tougher recycled plastic.

The high energy content of ^{178m2}Hf was the concern of a DARPA-funded program in the US. This program eventually concluded that using the ^{178m2}Hf nuclear isomer of hafnium to construct high-yield weapons with X-ray triggering mechanisms—an application of induced gamma emission—was infeasible because of its expense and difficulty to manufacture. See hafnium controversy.

Hafnium diselenide is studied in spintronics thanks to its charge density wave and superconductivity.

== Toxicity and safety ==
Hafnium powder
Hazards
- GHS labelling
Pictograms	(GHS02: Flammable)
Signal word	Danger
Hazard statements	H228, H250
Precautionary statements	P210, P222, P231+P232, P233, P240, P370+P378
NFPA 704 (fire diamond)	0 4 0

Hafnium is a pyrophoric material, and as such fine particles can spontaneously combust upon exposure to air. Hafnium powder is often wetted with at least 25 % water by weight to be considered safe – the metal is insoluble in water. Machining hafnium is particularly hazardous because of the potential for fine particles of the metal to be produced and immediately introduced to frictional force. Compounds that contain this metal are rarely encountered by most people. The pure metal is not considered toxic, though it has been observed to accumulate in the liver when injected into rats, and the tetrachloride was found to cause liver damage at high exposure levels, Hafnium compounds should be handled as if they were toxic because the ionic forms of metals are normally at greatest risk for toxicity, and limited animal testing has been done for hafnium compounds. Hafnium tetrachloride and hafnium tetrabromide, which are often part of industrial processes that use the element, are of particular note, with both compounds releasing acidic fumes on contact with water (hydrochloric and hydrobromic acid, respectively)

People can be exposed to hafnium in the workplace by breathing, swallowing, skin, and eye contact. In the United States, the Occupational Safety and Health Administration (OSHA) has set the legal limit (permissible exposure limit) for exposure to hafnium and hafnium compounds in the workplace as TWA 0.5 mg/m^{3} over an 8-hour workday. The National Institute for Occupational Safety and Health (NIOSH) has set the same recommended exposure limit (REL). At levels of 50 mg/m^{3}, hafnium is immediately dangerous to life and health.

Because the mineral zircon is often associated with traces of the radioactive elements uranium and thorium, the chemically destructive processes used to separate zirconium from hafnium have potential to release these radioactive elements and their decay products into the environment along with other reaction wastes. Additionally, synthesis pathways that involve liquid-liquid extraction introduce ammonium chloride and sulfate into reaction mixtures, which as effluent can reduce available oxygen in water sources or produce cyanides if it comes into contact with thiocyanate-containing compounds.
