= Hafnium(IV) oxide =

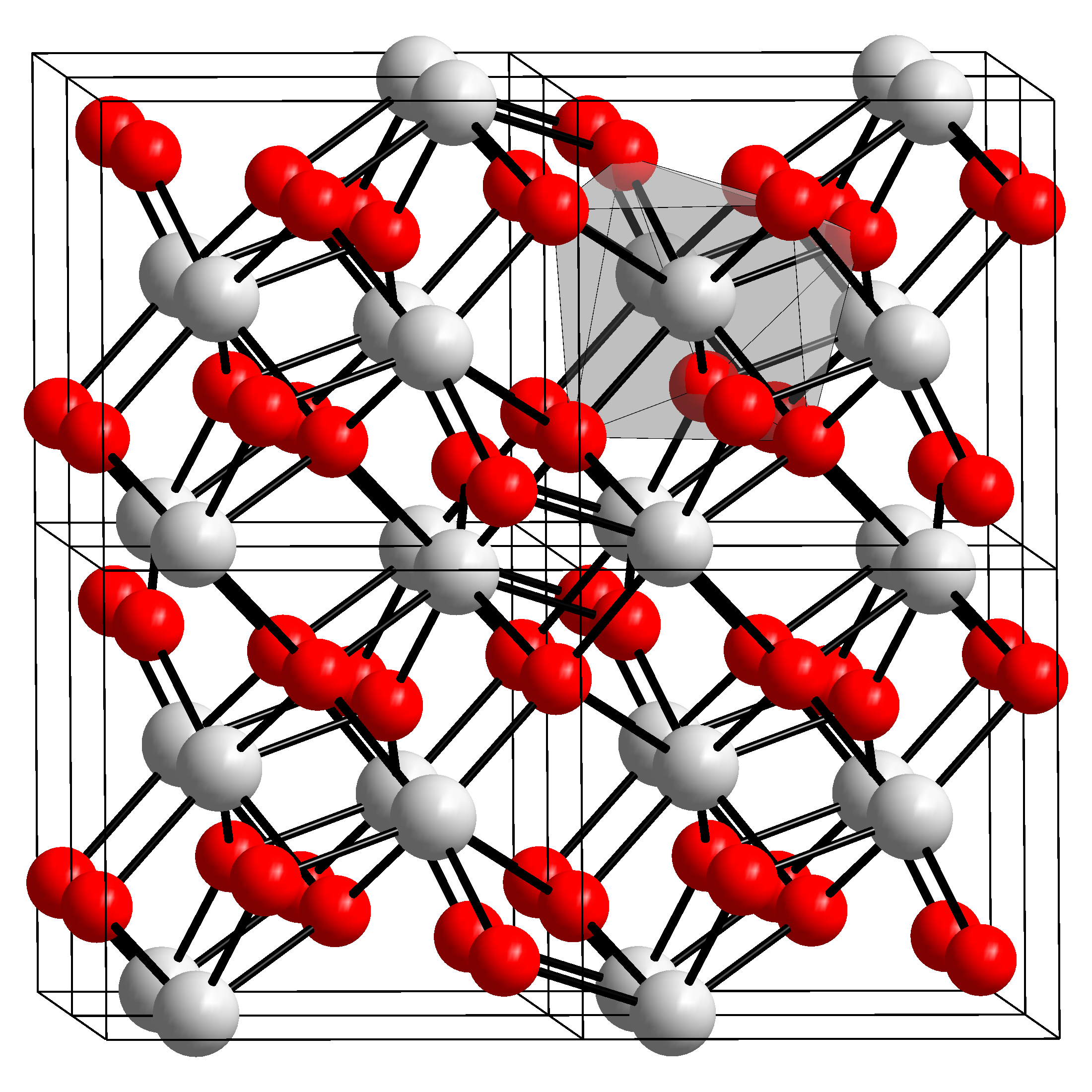
- Hafnium(IV) oxide structure

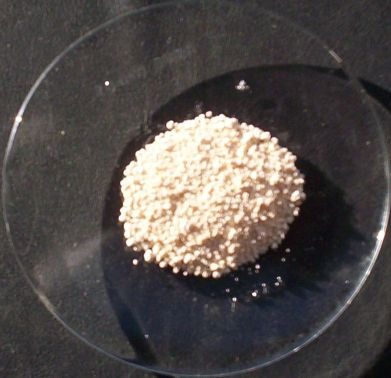
- Hafnium(IV) oxide

Names
- IUPAC name Hafnium(IV) oxide
- Other names Hafnium dioxide Hafnia

Identifiers
CAS Number	12055-23-1
3D model (JSmol)	Interactive image
ChemSpider	258363
ECHA InfoCard	100.031.818
EC Number	235-013-2
PubChem CID	292779
UNII	3C4Z4KG52T
CompTox Dashboard (EPA)	DTXSID70893204
- InChI: InChI=1S/Hf.2O Key: CJNBYAVZURUTKZ-UHFFFAOYSA-N; InChI=1/Hf.2O/rHfO2/c2-1-3 Key: CJNBYAVZURUTKZ-MSHMTBKAAI
- SMILES: O=[Hf]=O

Properties
Chemical formula	HfO_{2}
Molar mass	210.49 g/mol
Appearance	off-white powder
Density	9.68 g/cm^{3}, solid
Melting point	2,758 °C (4,996 °F; 3,031 K)
Boiling point	5,400 °C (9,750 °F; 5,670 K)
Solubility in water	insoluble
Magnetic susceptibility (χ)	−23.0·10^{−6} cm^{3}/mol

Thermochemistry
Std enthalpy of formation (Δ_{f}H^{⦵}_{298})	–1117 kJ/mol

Hazards
Flash point	Non-flammable

Related compounds
Other cations	Titanium(IV) oxide Zirconium(IV) oxide
Related compounds	Hafnium nitrides
- Except where otherwise noted, data are given for materials in their standard state (at 25 °C [77 °F], 100 kPa). verify (what is ?) Infobox references

Hafnium(IV) oxide is the inorganic compound with the formula HfO_{2}. Also known as hafnium dioxide or hafnia, this colourless solid is one of the most common and stable compounds of hafnium. It is an electrical insulator with a band gap of 5.3~5.7 eV. Hafnium dioxide is an intermediate in some processes that yield hafnium metal.

Hafnium(IV) oxide is quite inert. It reacts with strong acids such as concentrated sulfuric acid and with strong bases. It dissolves slowly in hydrofluoric acid to give fluorohafnate anions. At elevated temperatures, it reacts with chlorine in the presence of graphite or carbon tetrachloride to give hafnium tetrachloride.

== Structure ==
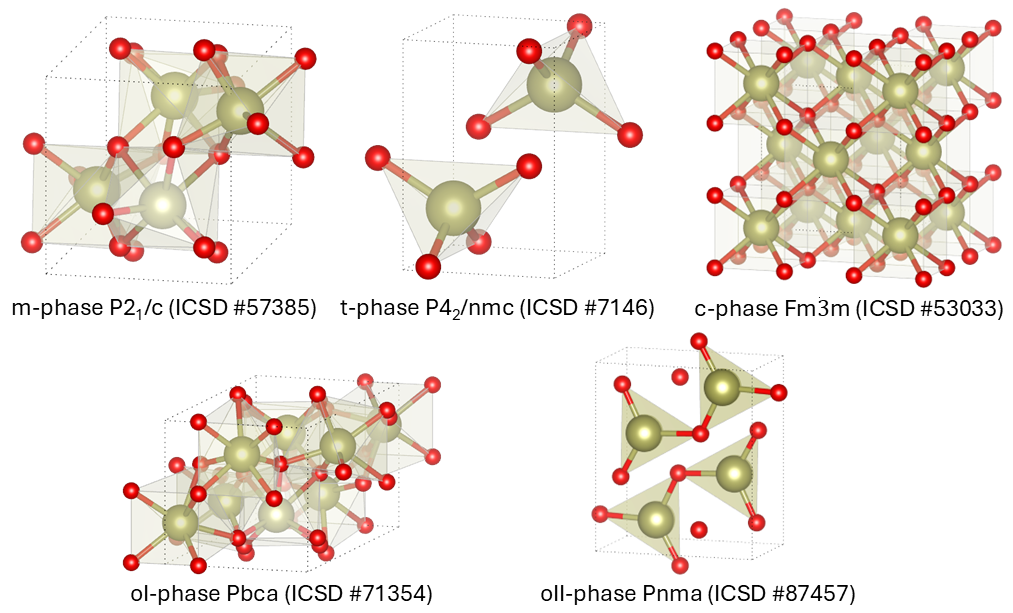
Monoclinic, tetragonal, cubic, and orthorhombic phases of hafnia

Hafnia typically adopts the same structure as zirconia (ZrO_{2}). Unlike TiO_{2}, which features six-coordinate Ti in all phases, zirconia and hafnia consist of seven-coordinate metal centres. A variety of crystalline phases have been experimentally observed, including cubic fluorite (Fm3̅m), tetragonal (P4_{2}/nmc), monoclinic (P2_{1}/c) and orthorhombic (Pbca and Pnma). It is also known that hafnia may adopt two other orthorhombic metastable phases (space group Pca2_{1} and Pmn2_{1}) over a wide range of pressures and temperatures, presumably being the sources of the ferroelectricity observed in thin films of hafnia. A rhombohedral phase of hafnia also exists.

Under ambient pressure, HfO₂ adopts the monoclinic baddeleyite structure (m-phase, space group P2₁/c) at room temperature. With increasing temperature, it transforms to a tetragonal phase (P4₂/nmc) at approximately 1700 °C and subsequently to a cubic phase (Fm3̅m) near 2600 °C.

In addition to ambient-pressure polymorphs, HfO₂ exhibits high-pressure orthorhombic phases, commonly referred to as ortho-I (oI) and ortho-II (oII). With increasing pressure, phase transitions from the monoclinic phase to the oI phase and subsequently to the oII phase have been reported, with some early studies suggesting an additional transition at higher pressures. The space group of the oI phase is frequently assigned as Pbca, although alternative assignments such as Pbcm have been reported in earlier work. The oII phase adopts a cotunnite-type structure with space group Pmnb/Pnma.

Thin films of hafnium oxides deposited by atomic layer deposition are usually crystalline. Because semiconductor devices benefit from having amorphous films present, researchers have alloyed hafnium oxide with aluminum or silicon (forming hafnium silicates), which have a higher crystallization temperature than hafnium oxide.

== Applications ==
Hafnia is used in optical coatings, and as a high-κ dielectric in DRAM capacitors and in advanced metal–oxide–semiconductor devices. Hafnium-based oxides were introduced by Intel in 2007 as a replacement for silicon oxide as a gate insulator in field-effect transistors. The advantage for transistors is its high dielectric constant: the dielectric constant of HfO_{2} is 4–6 times higher than that of SiO_{2}, which is 3.9. The dielectric constant and other properties depend on the deposition method, composition and microstructure of the material.

== Research ==
Hafnium oxide (as well as doped and oxygen-deficient hafnium oxide) attracts additional interest as a possible candidate for resistive-switching memories and CMOS-compatible ferroelectric memories such as ferroelectric field effect transistors (FeFET memory), ferroelectric RAM (FeRAM) and ferroelectric tunnel junction (FTJ), as well as memory chips.

As silicon technology approached its scaling limit, ferroelectric hafnia is seen as one of the potential replacements for CMOS and beyond-CMOS devices for current and future electronics. It has the potential to enhance the design of electronic devices and challenge the traditional von Neumann computing paradigm by enabling near-memory computing, which allows for higher speed and lower power consumption in energy-efficient non-volatile memories, neuromorphic devices, and AI applications. Beyond computing, its ferroelectric, dielectric, and pyroelectric properties are also being studied for applications in sensors and other emerging technologies

Because of its very high melting point, hafnia is also used as a refractory material in the insulation of such devices as thermocouples, where it can operate at temperatures up to 2500 °C.

Multilayered films of hafnium dioxide, silica, and other materials have been developed for use in passive cooling of buildings. The films reflect sunlight and radiate heat at wavelengths that pass through Earth's atmosphere, and can have temperatures several degrees cooler than surrounding materials under the same conditions.

== Challenges ==
HfO₂-based ferroelectrics face several challenges across materials, devices, integration, and applications. Ferroelectricity in hafnia-based thin films has been most consistently associated with metastable non-centrosymmetric crystal phases, including the oIII phase (Pca2_{1}), oIV phase (Pmn2_{1}), and rhombohedral ferroelectric phases (R3 or R3m). On the material side, difficulties include stabilizing the metastable orthorhombic phase and controlling oxygen vacancy concentration. Phase stabilization approaches include chemical doping, control of oxygen vacancy concentration, application of external stress or epitaxial strain, surface and size effects, and non-equilibrium thermal processing. Research opportunities focus on controlled doping strategies, superlattice engineering, strain/interface engineering, and exploring novel lead-free systems.

At the device level, issues such as wake-up and fatigue effects, endurance limits under full switching, scaling below 10 nm, and charge-trapping in FeFETs hinder reliability, but approaches like domain engineering, low-voltage partial switching, advanced 3D device architectures, and interface dielectrics offer promising solutions. In terms of integration, BEOL compatibility, wafer-scale uniformity, interfacial degradation, and process variability remain major obstacles, yet ALD-based deposition, interface control for oxygen vacancy management, and stacked or multilayer designs for 3D memory integration are promising paths forward. Finally, for applications, limitations include NVM endurance, thermal drift, and CIM-related static power and accuracy losses, but future opportunities lie in asymmetric programming, superlattice capacitors, cryogenic-optimized memory, ferroelectric CIM, FeCAP-based systems, and neuromorphic or reservoir computing architectures.

In addition to ferroelectric hafnia, antiferroelectric hafnia (Pbca phase) follows the Kittle model, the intrinsic antiferroelectricity of single-crystalline La doped HfO_{2} film is stable under the 2D limit with very high Curie temperature (Tc) at 850 °C, indicating the potential of HfO_{2} for antiferroelectric devices.
