= White =

Lightest color

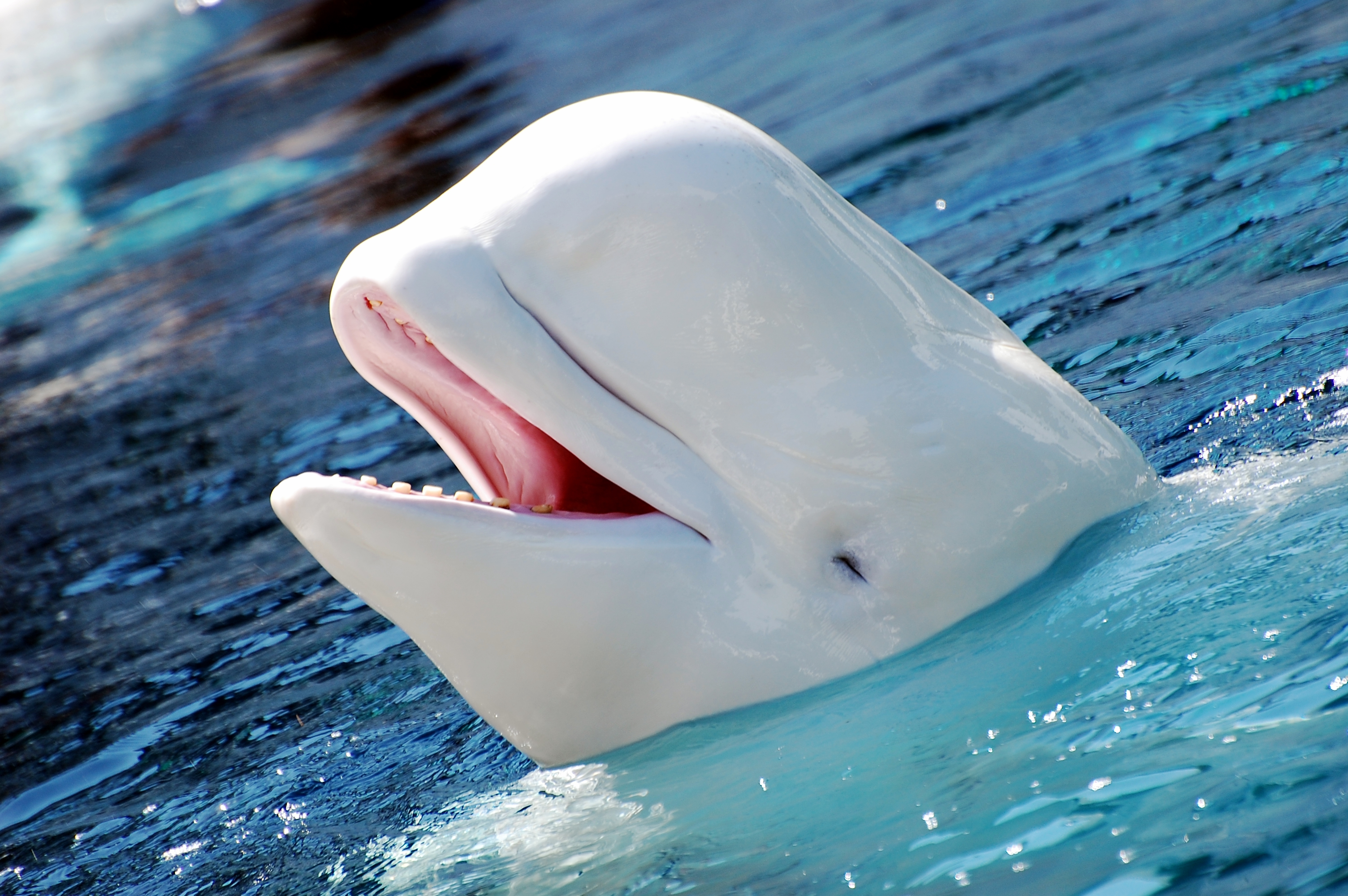
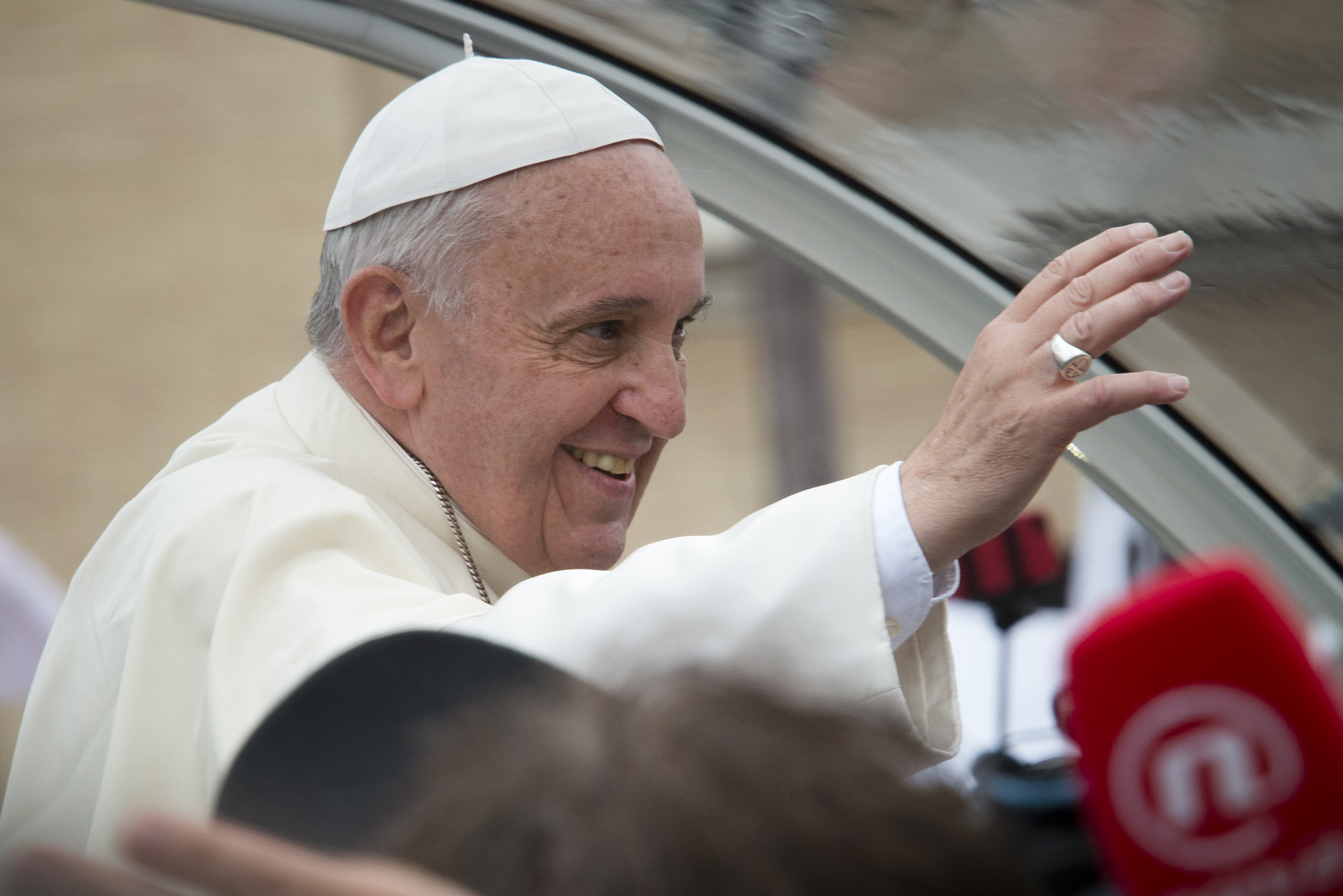
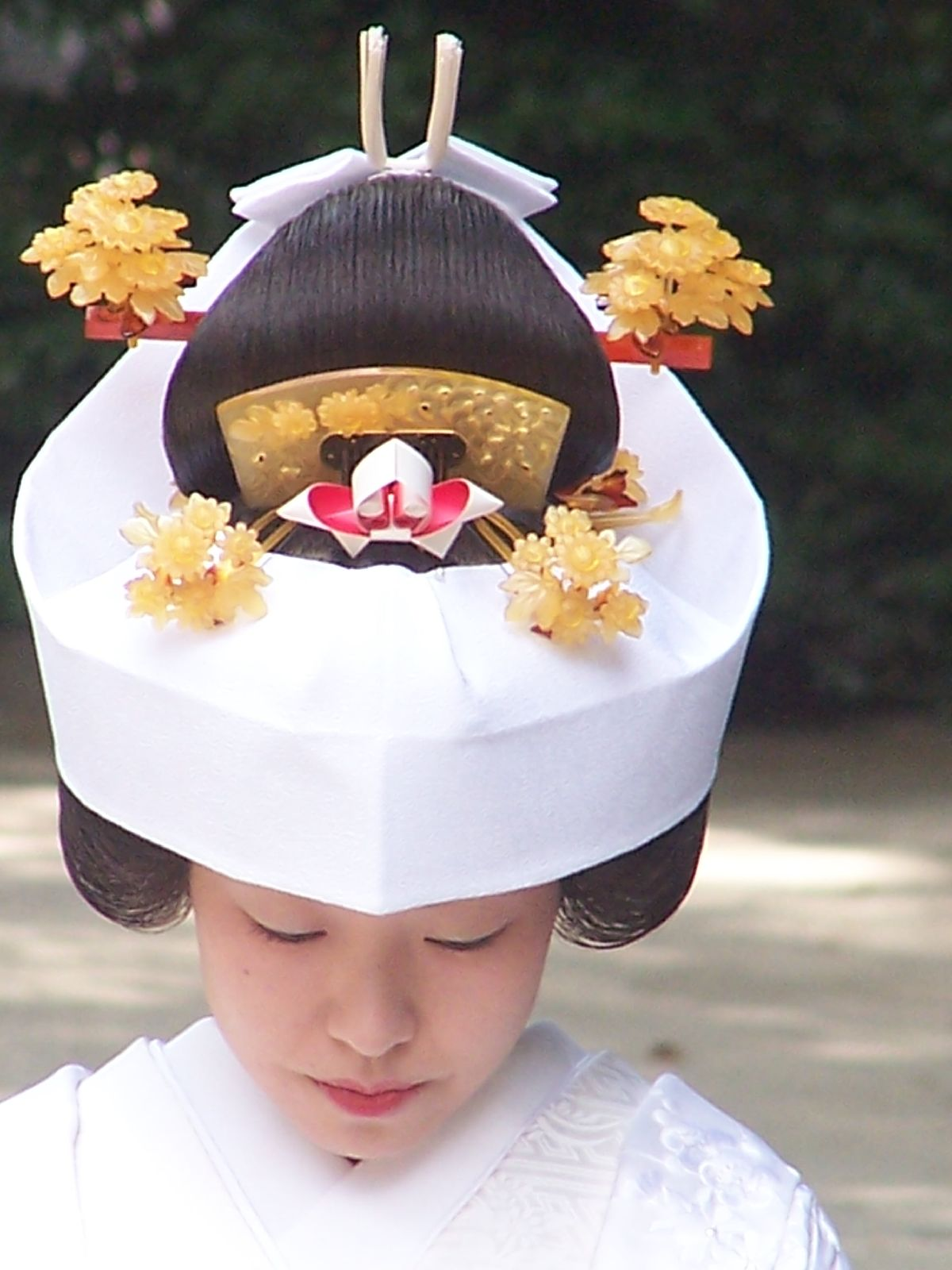
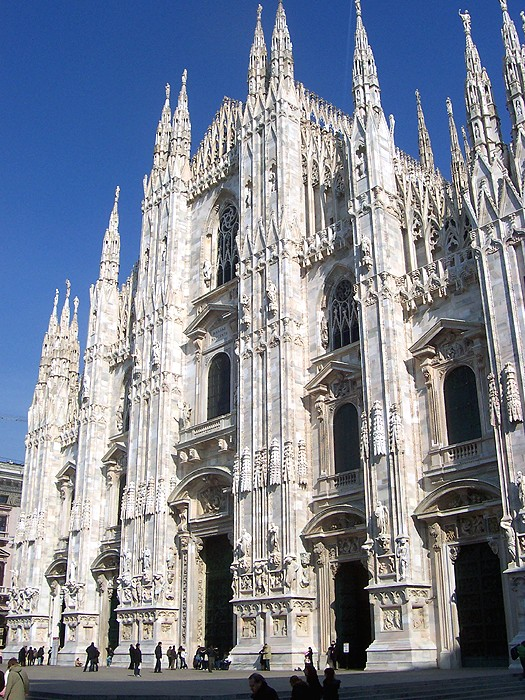
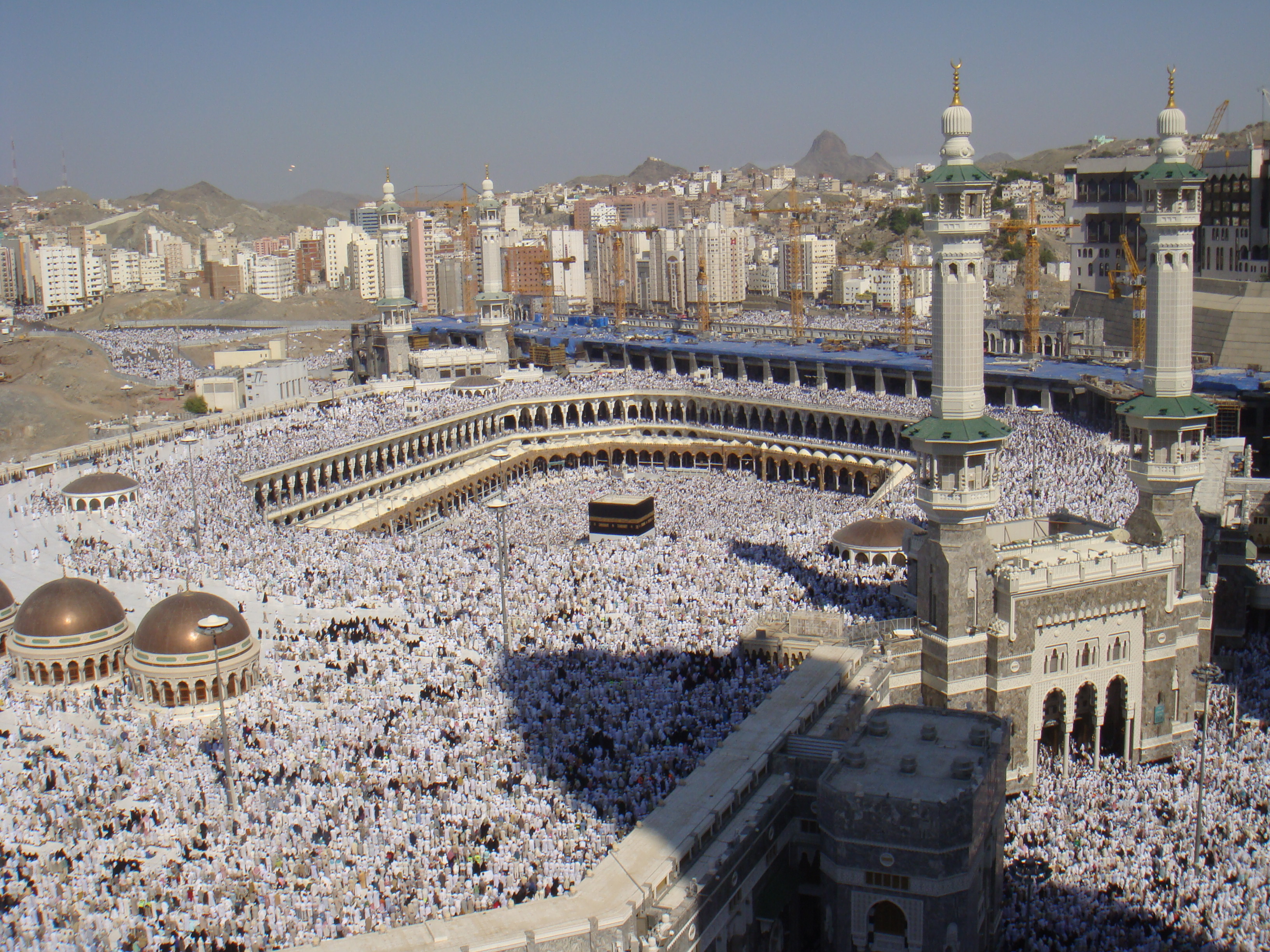
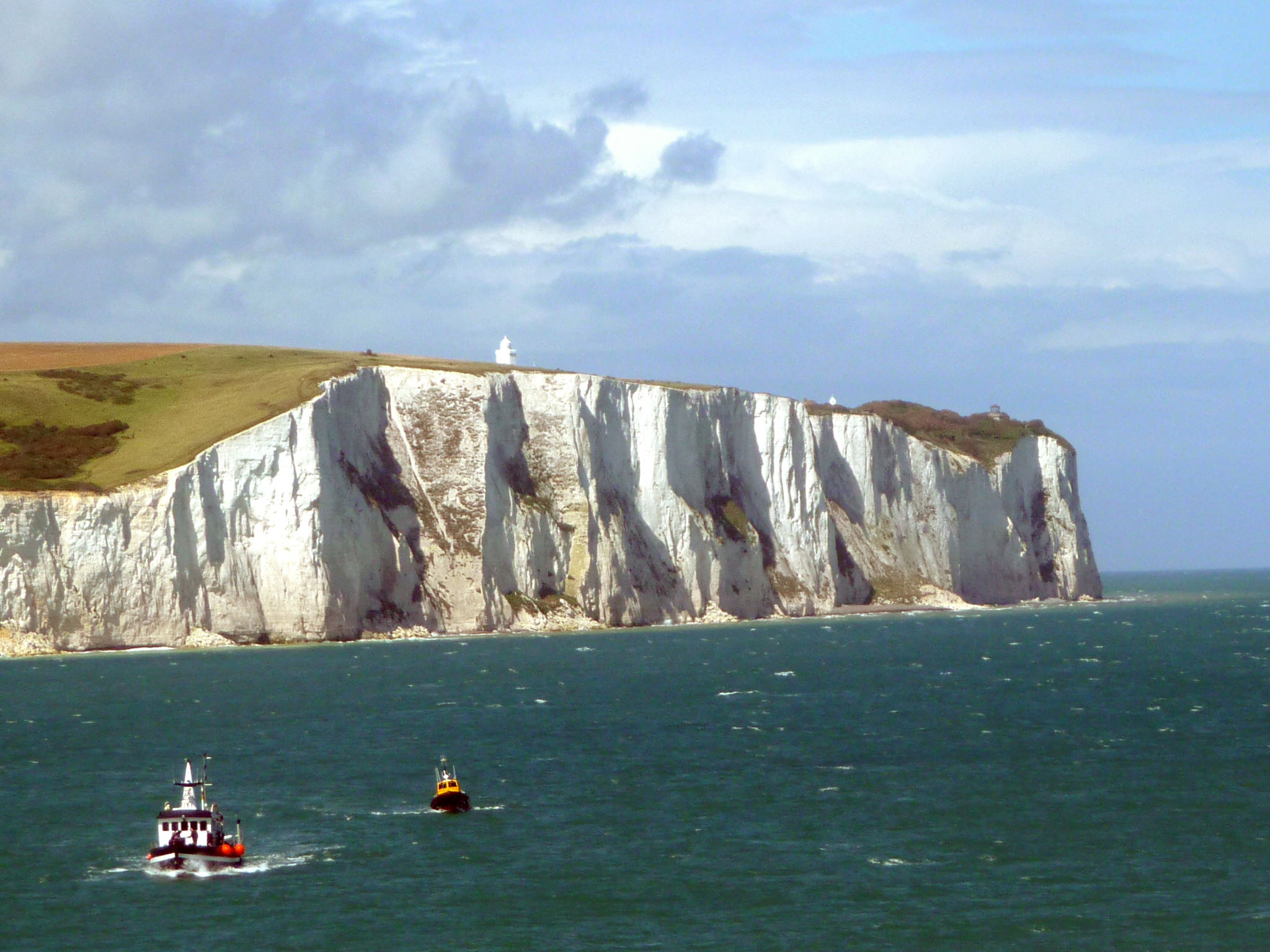
- Clockwise, from top left: a Beluga whale; Pope Francis; the façade of Milan Cathedral; White Cliffs of Dover; Masjid al-Haram, Saudi Arabia; a bride at a Shinto wedding

Color coordinates
- Hex triplet: #FFFFFF
- sRGB^{B} (r, g, b): (255, 255, 255)
- HSV (h, s, v): (0°, 0%, 100%)
- CIELCh_{uv} (L, C, h): (100, 0, 0°)
- Source: HTML/CSS
- B: Normalized to [0–255] (byte); H: Normalized to [0–100] (hundred)

White is the lightest color and is achromatic (having no chroma). It is the color of objects such as snow, chalk, and milk, and is the opposite of black. White objects fully (or almost fully) reflect and scatter all the visible wavelengths of light. White on television and computer screens is created by a mixture of red, blue, and green light. The color white can be given with white pigments, especially titanium dioxide.

In ancient Egypt and ancient Rome, priestesses wore white as a symbol of purity, and Romans wore white togas as symbols of citizenship. In the Middle Ages and Renaissance a white unicorn symbolized chastity, and a white lamb sacrifice and purity. It was the royal color of the kings of France as well as the flag of monarchist France from 1815 to 1830, and of the monarchist movement that opposed the Bolsheviks during the Russian Civil War (1917–1922). Greek temples and Roman temples were faced with white marble, and beginning in the 18th century, with the advent of neoclassical architecture, white became the most common color of new churches, capitols, and other government buildings, especially in the United States. It was also widely used in 20th century modern architecture as a symbol of modernity and simplicity.

According to surveys in Europe and the United States, white is the color most often associated with perfection, the good, honesty, cleanliness, the beginning, the new, neutrality, and exactitude. White is an important color for almost all world religions. The pope, the head of the Roman Catholic Church, has worn white since 1566, as a symbol of purity and sacrifice. In Islam, and in the Shinto religion of Japan, it is worn by pilgrims. In Western cultures and in Japan, white is the most common color for wedding dresses, symbolizing purity and virginity. In many Asian cultures, white is also the color of mourning.

== Etymology ==
The word white continues Old English hwīt, ultimately from a Proto-Germanic *hʷītaz also reflected in Old High German (h)wîz, Old Norse hvítr, and Gothic 𐍈𐌴𐌹𐍄𐍃 (ƕeits). The root is ultimately from Proto-Indo-European language *kʷid-, surviving also in Sanskrit śveta "to be white or bright" and Slavonic světŭ "light". The Icelandic word for white, hvítur, is directly derived from the Old Norse form of the word hvítr. Proto-Germanic also had the word *blankaz ("white, bright, blinding"), borrowed into Late Latin as *blancus, which provided the source for Romance words for "white" (Catalan, Occitan and French blanc, Spanish blanco, Italian bianco, Galician-Portuguese branco, etc.). The antonym of white is black.

Some non-European languages have a wide variety of terms for white. The Inuit language has seven different words for seven different nuances of white. Sanskrit has specific words for bright white, the white of teeth, the white of sandalwood, the white of the autumn moon, the white of silver, the white of cow's milk, the white of pearls, the white of a ray of sunlight, and the white of stars. Japanese has six different words, depending upon brilliance or dullness, or if the color is inert or dynamic.

== History and art ==
=== Prehistoric and ancient history ===
White was one of the first colors used in art. The Lascaux Cave in France contains drawings of bulls and other animals drawn by paleolithic artists between 18,000 and 17,000 years ago. Paleolithic artists used calcite or chalk, sometimes as a background, sometimes as a highlight, along with charcoal and red and yellow ochre in their vivid cave paintings.

In ancient Egypt, white was connected with the goddess Isis. The priests and priestesses of Isis dressed only in white linen, and it was used to wrap mummies.

In Greece and other ancient civilizations, white was often associated with mother's milk. In Greek mythology, the chief god Zeus was nourished at the breast of the nymph Amalthea.

The ancient Greeks saw the world in terms of darkness and light, so white was considered a fundamental color. According to Pliny the Elder in his Natural History, Apelles (4th century BC) and the other famous painters of ancient Greece used only four colors in their paintings; white, red, yellow and black. For painting, the Greeks used the highly toxic pigment lead white, made by a long and laborious process.

A plain white toga, known as a toga virilis, was worn for ceremonial occasions by all Roman citizens over the age of 14–18. Magistrates and certain priests wore a toga praetexta, with a broad purple stripe. In the time of the Emperor Augustus, no Roman man was allowed to appear in the Roman forum without a toga.

The ancient Romans had two words for white; albus, a plain white, (the source of the word albino); and candidus, a brighter white. A man who wanted public office in Rome wore a white toga brightened with chalk, called a toga candida, the origin of the word candidate. The Latin word candere meant to shine, to be bright. It was the origin of the words candle and candid.

In ancient Rome, the priestesses of the goddess Vesta dressed in white linen robes, a white palla or shawl, and a white veil. They protected the sacred fire and the penates of Rome. White symbolized their purity, loyalty, and chastity.

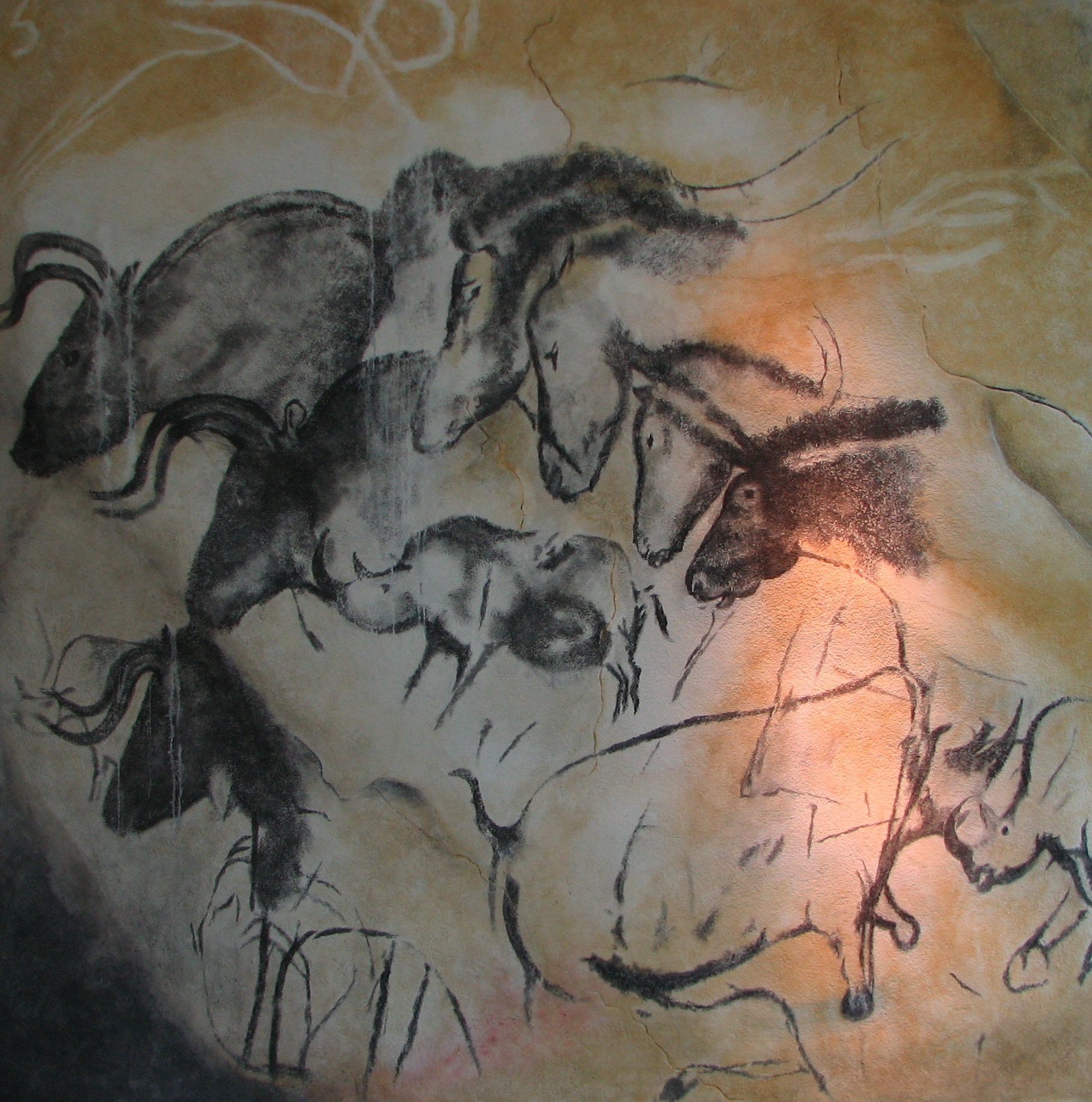
Prehistoric paintings in Chauvet Cave, France (30,000 to 32,000 BC)

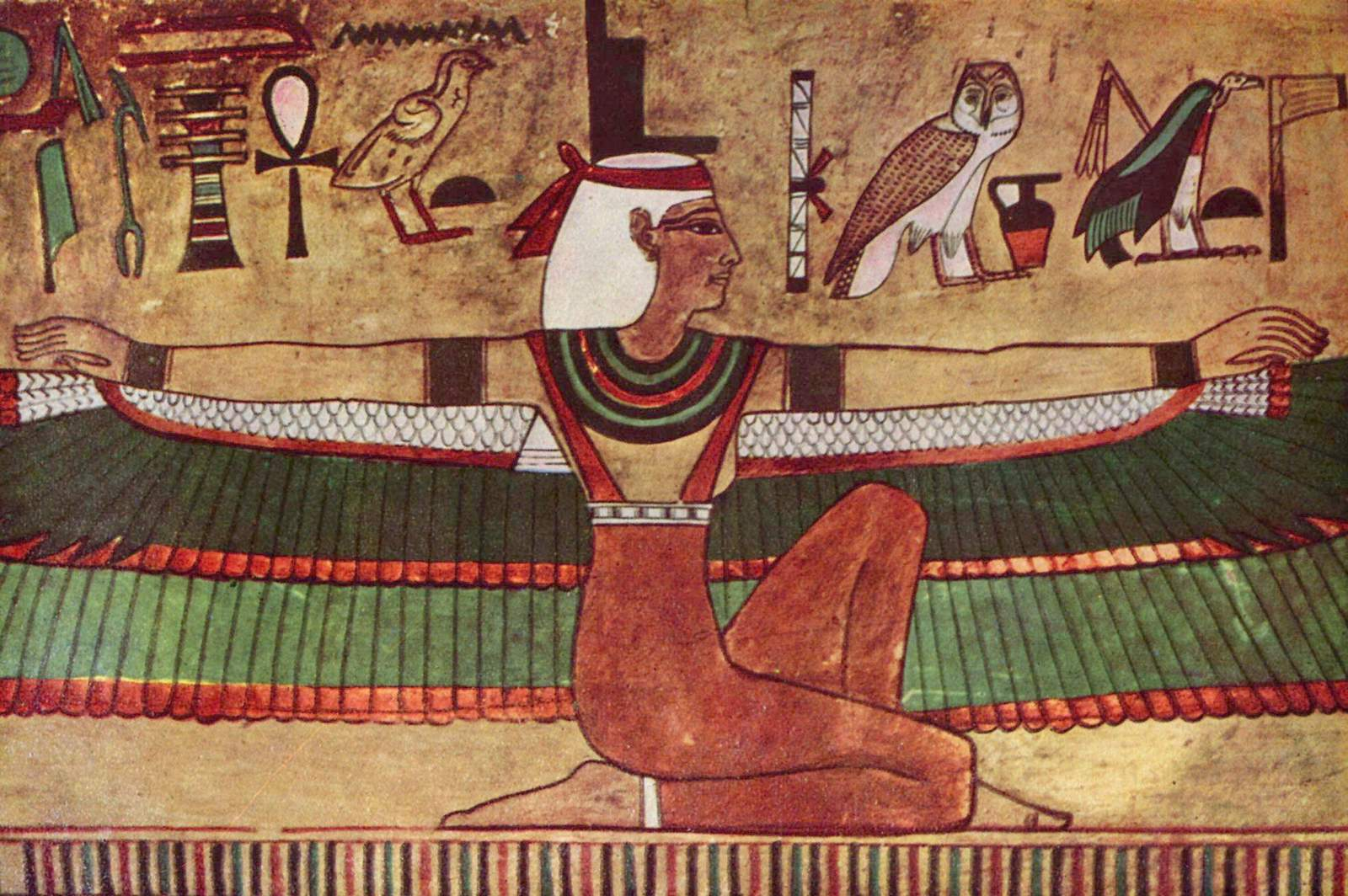
Painting of the goddess Isis (1380–1385 BC). The priests of her cult wore white linen.

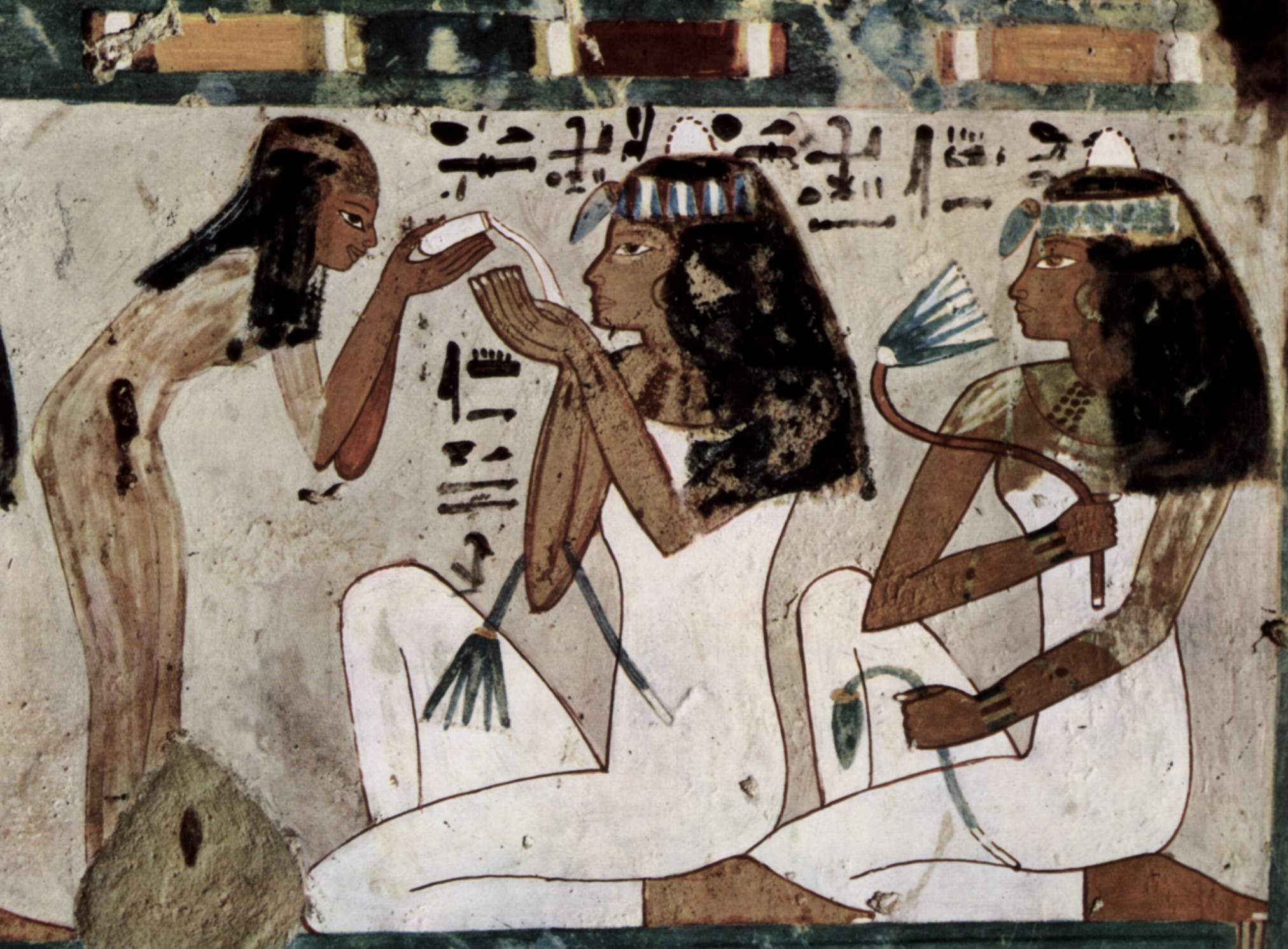
Paintings of women in white from a tomb (1448–1422 BC).

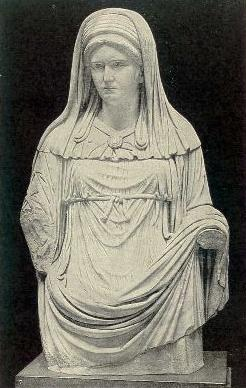
Statue of the chief Vestal Virgin, wearing a white palla and a white veil.

=== Postclassical history ===
The early Christian church adopted the Roman symbolism of white as the color of purity, sacrifice and virtue. It became the color worn by priests during Mass, the color worn by monks of the Cistercian Order, and, under Pope Pius V, a former monk of the Dominican Order, it became the official color worn by the pope himself. Monks of the Order of Saint Benedict dressed in the white or gray of natural undyed wool, but later changed to black, the color of humility and penitence.

The white lamb became the symbol of the sacrifice of Christ on behalf of humankind. John the Baptist described Christ as the lamb of God, who took the sins of the world upon himself. The white lamb was the center of one of the most famous paintings of the Medieval period, the Ghent Altarpiece by Jan van Eyck.

White was also the symbolic color of the transfiguration. The Gospel of Saint Mark describes Jesus' clothing in this event as "shining, exceeding white as snow." Artists such as Fra Angelico used their skill to capture the whiteness of his garments. In his painting of the transfiguration at the Convent of Saint Mark in Florence, Fra Angelico emphasized the white garment by using a light gold background, placed in an almond-shaped halo.

The white unicorn was a common subject of Postclassical history manuscripts, paintings and tapestries. It was a symbol of purity, chastity and grace, which could only be captured by a virgin. It was often portrayed in the lap of the Virgin Mary.

During the Postclassical history, painters rarely ever mixed colors; but in the Renaissance, the influential humanist and scholar Leon Battista Alberti encouraged artists to add white to their colors to make them lighter, brighter, and to add hilaritas, or gaiety. Many painters followed his advice, and the palette of the Renaissance was considerably brighter.

=== Modern history ===
Until the 16th century, white was commonly worn by widows as a color of mourning. The widows of the kings of France wore white until Anne of Brittany in the 16th century. A white tunic was also worn by many knights, along with a red cloak, which showed the knights were willing to give their blood for the king or Church.

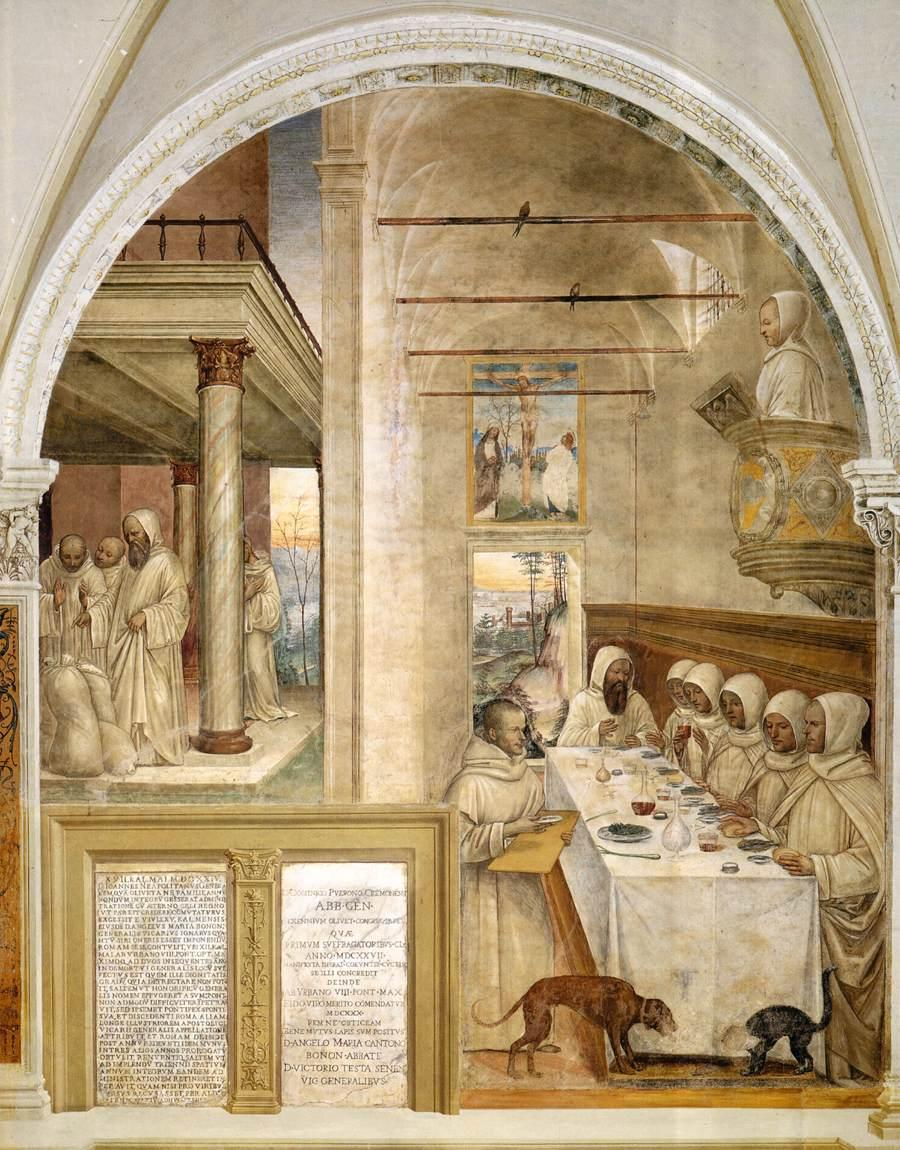
The monks of the order of Saint Benedict (c. 480–542) first dressed in undyed white or gray wool robes, here shown in painting by Sodoma on the life of Saint Benedict (1504). They later changed to black robes, the color of humility and penitence.

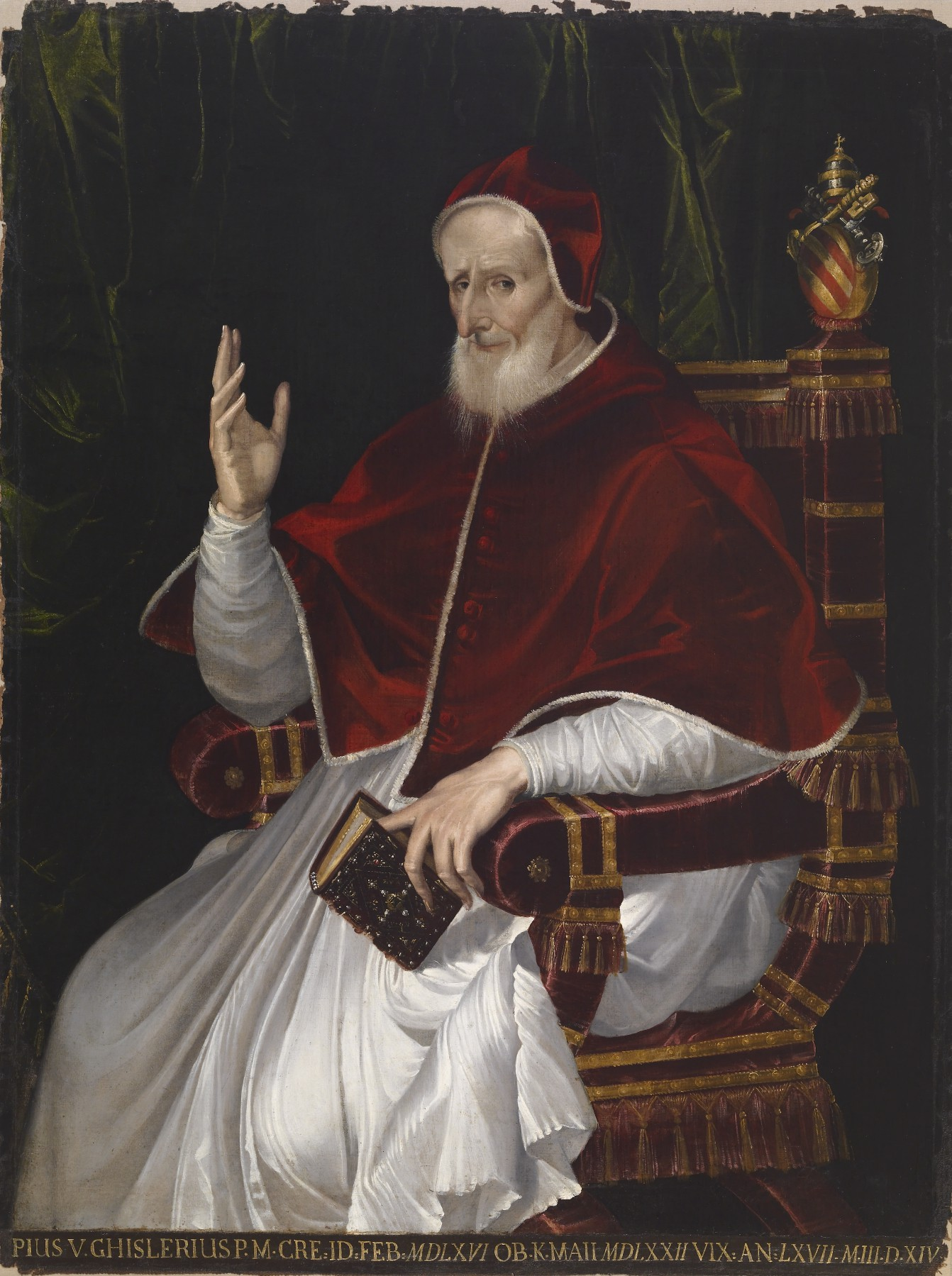
Under Pope Pius V (1504–1572), a former monk of the Dominican Order, white became the official color worn by the Pope.

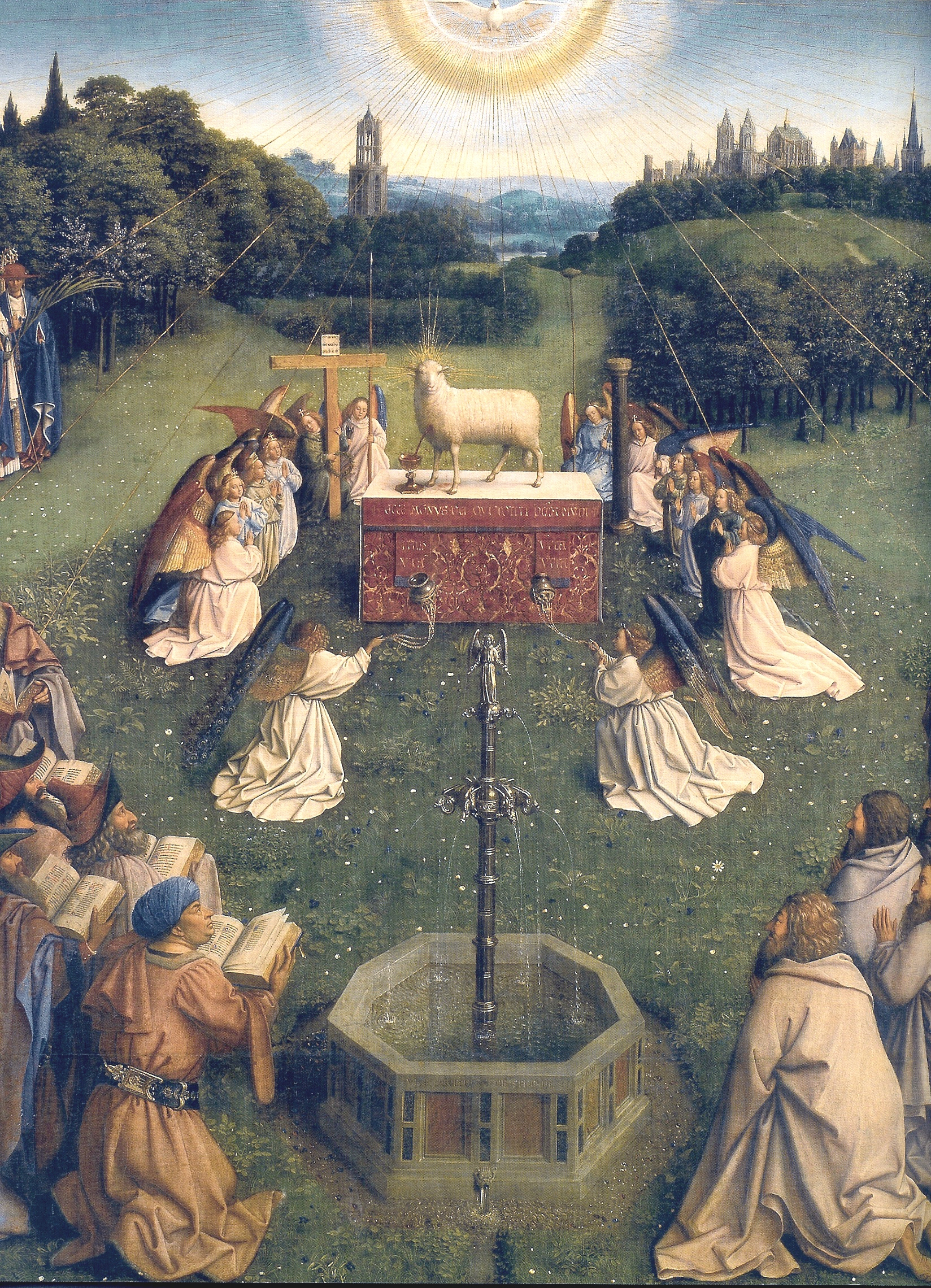
The white lamb in the Ghent Altarpiece by Jan van Eyck. (1432)

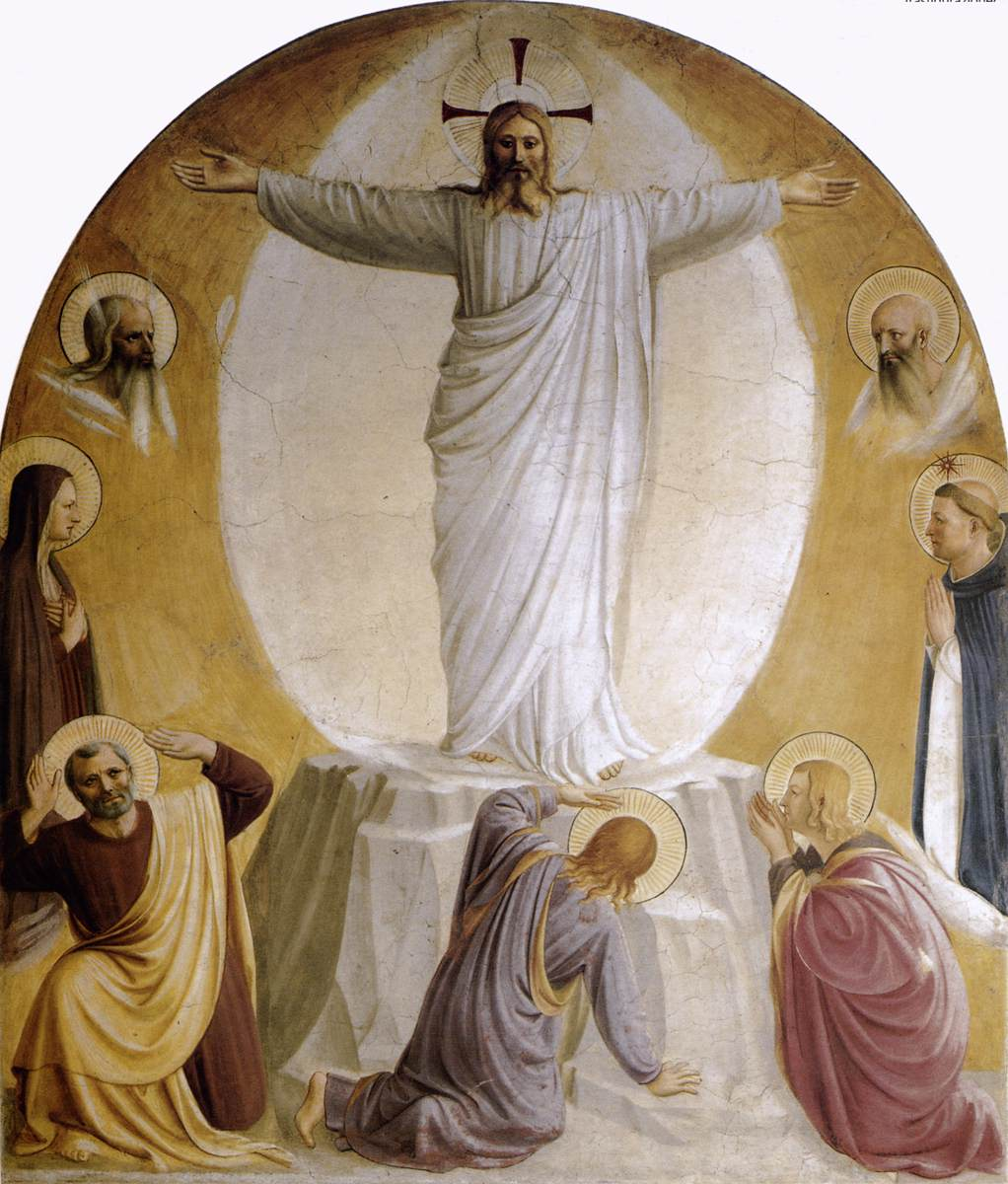
The Transfiguration by Fra Angelico (1440–1442)

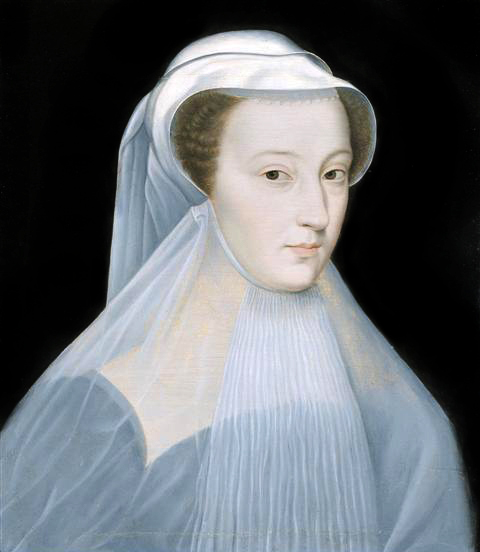
Mary Stuart wore white in mourning for her husband, King Francis II of France, who died in 1560.

==== 18th and 19th centuries ====
White was the dominant color of architectural interiors in the Baroque period and especially the Rococo style that followed it in the 18th century. Church interiors were designed to show the power, glory and wealth of the church. They seemed to be alive, filled with curves, asymmetry, mirrors, gilding, statuary and reliefs, unified by white.

White was also a fashionable color for both men and women in the 18th century. Men in the aristocracy and upper classes wore powdered white wigs and white stockings, and women wore elaborate embroidered white and pastel gowns.

After the French Revolution, a more austere white (blanc cassé) became the most fashionable color in women's costumes which were modeled after the outfits of Ancient Greece and Republican Rome. Because of the rather revealing design of these dresses, the women wearing them were called les merveilleuses (the marvellous) by French men of that era. The Empire style under Emperor Napoléon I was modeled after the more conservative outfits of Ancient Imperial Rome. The dresses were high in fashion but low in warmth considering the more severe weather conditions of northern France; in 1814 the former wife of Napoleon, Joséphine de Beauharnais, caught pneumonia and died after taking a walk in the cold night air with Tsar Alexander I of Russia.

White was the universal color of both men and women's underwear and of sheets in the 18th and 19th centuries. It was unthinkable to have sheets or underwear of any other color. The reason was simple; the manner of washing linen in boiling water caused colors to fade. When linen was worn out, it was collected and turned into high-quality paper.

The 19th-century American painter James McNeill Whistler (1834–1903), working at the same time as the French impressionists, created a series of paintings with musical titles where he used color to create moods, the way composers used music. His painting Symphony in White No. 1 – The White Girl, which used his mistress Joanna Hiffernan as a model, used delicate colors to portray innocence and fragility, and a moment of uncertainty.

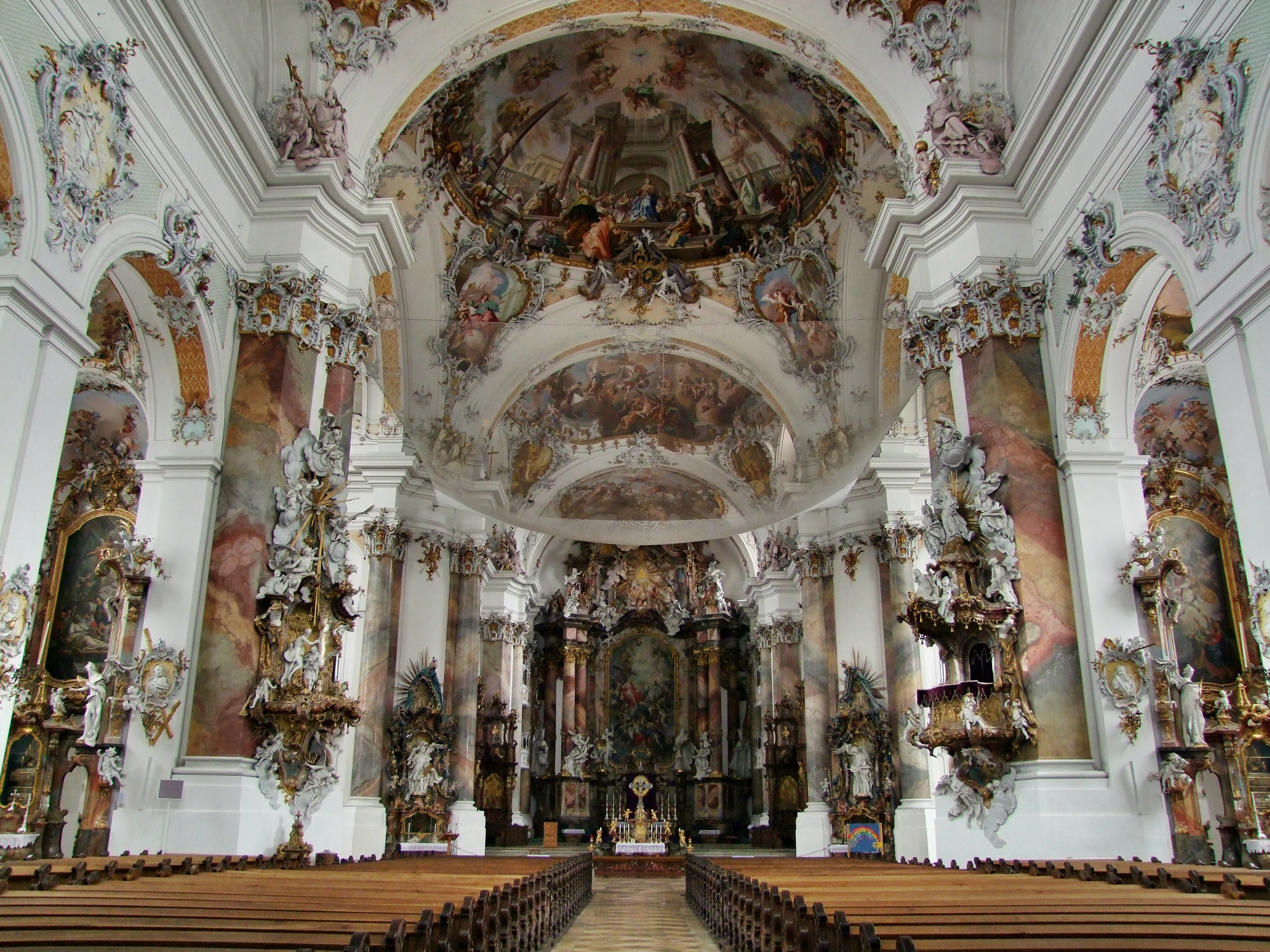
A highly theatrical white Rococo interior from the 18th century, at the Basilica at Ottobeuren, in Bavaria.

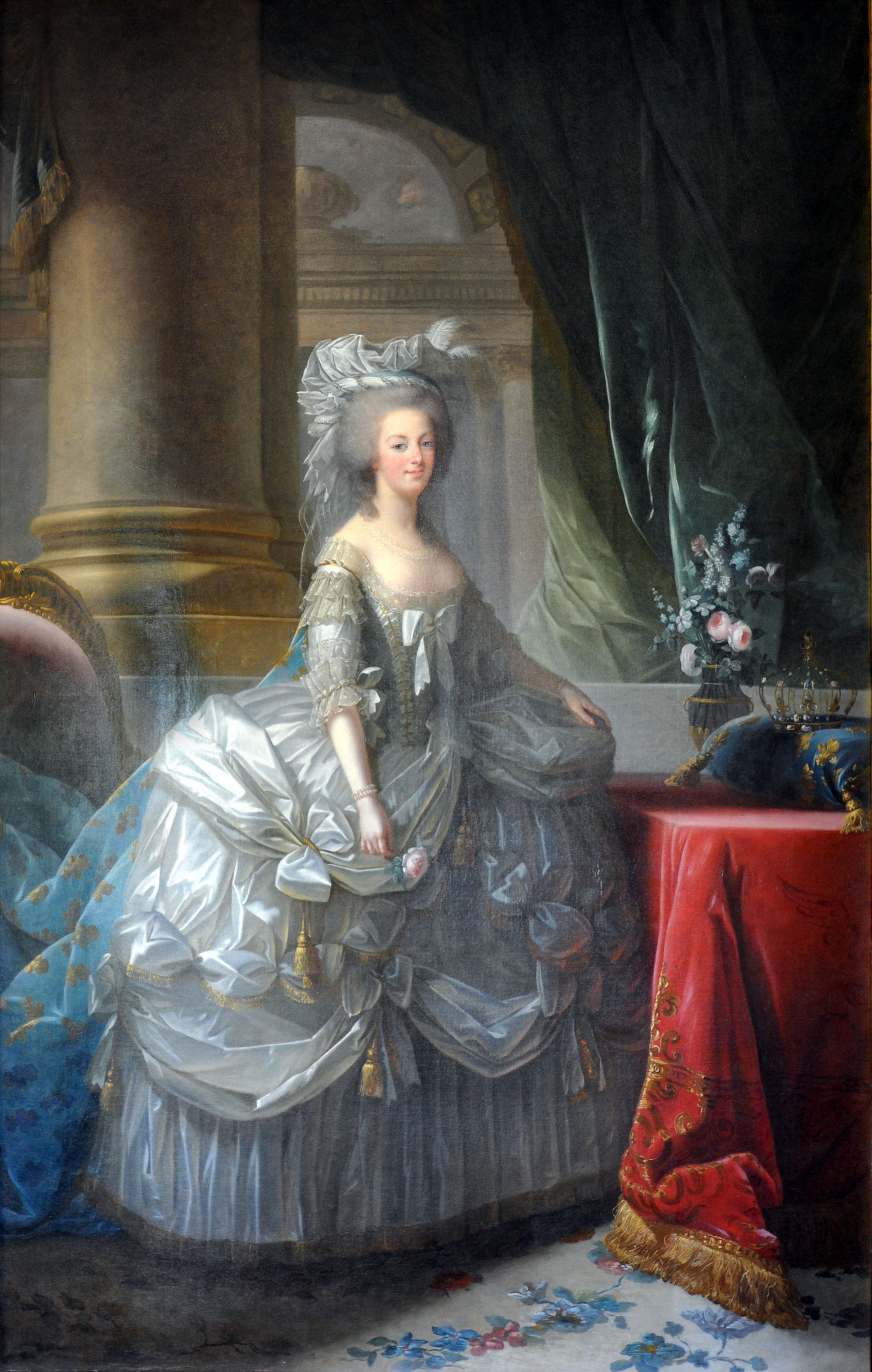
White gown of Marie Antoinette, painted by Elisabeth Vigée-Lebrun in 1783.

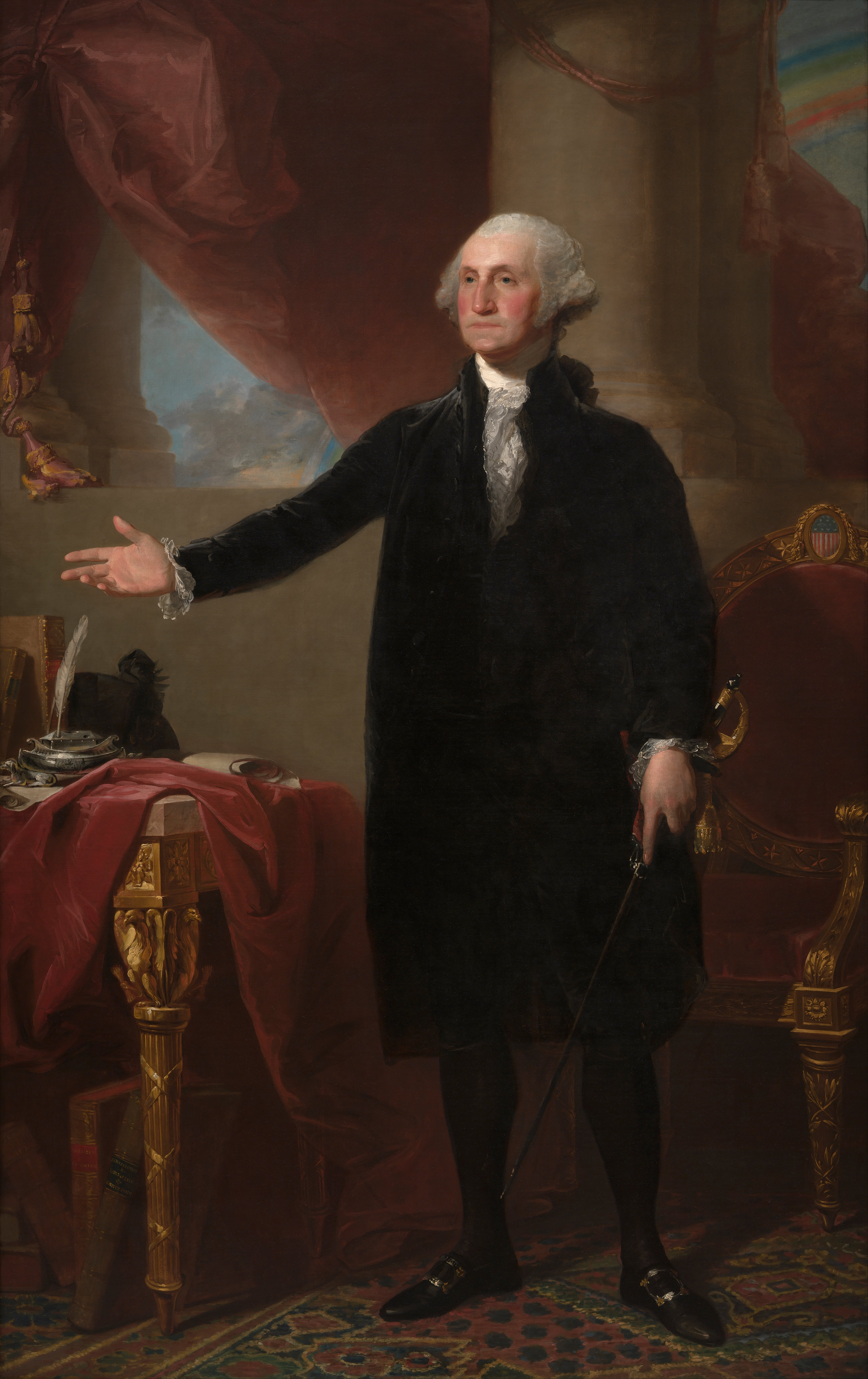
President George Washington in a white powdered wig. The first five Presidents of the United States wore dark suits with powdered wigs for formal occasions.

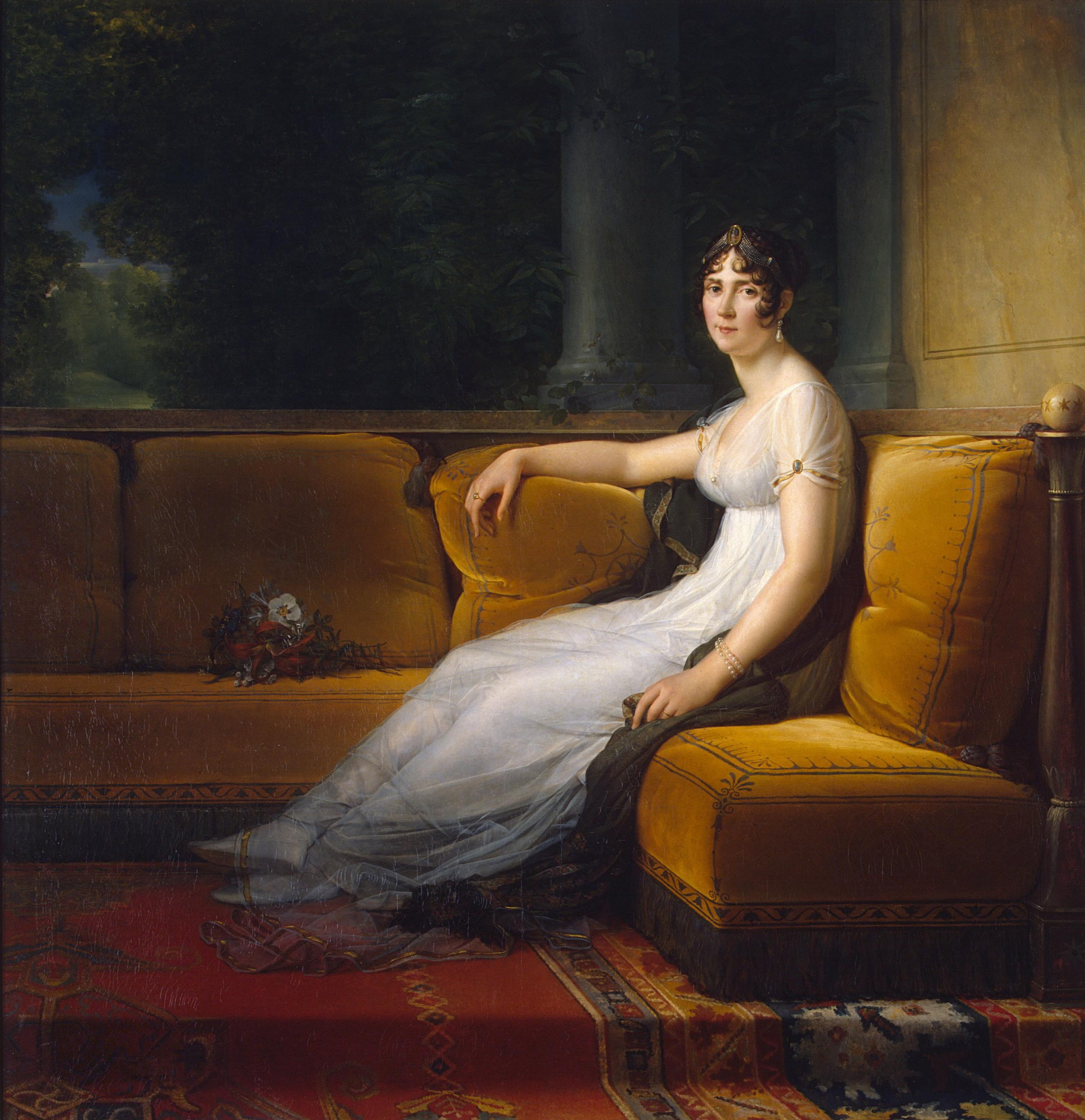
Portrait of Joséphine de Beauharnais in a classic Empire gown, modeled after the clothing of ancient Rome. (1801), by François Gérard. (The State Hermitage Museum).

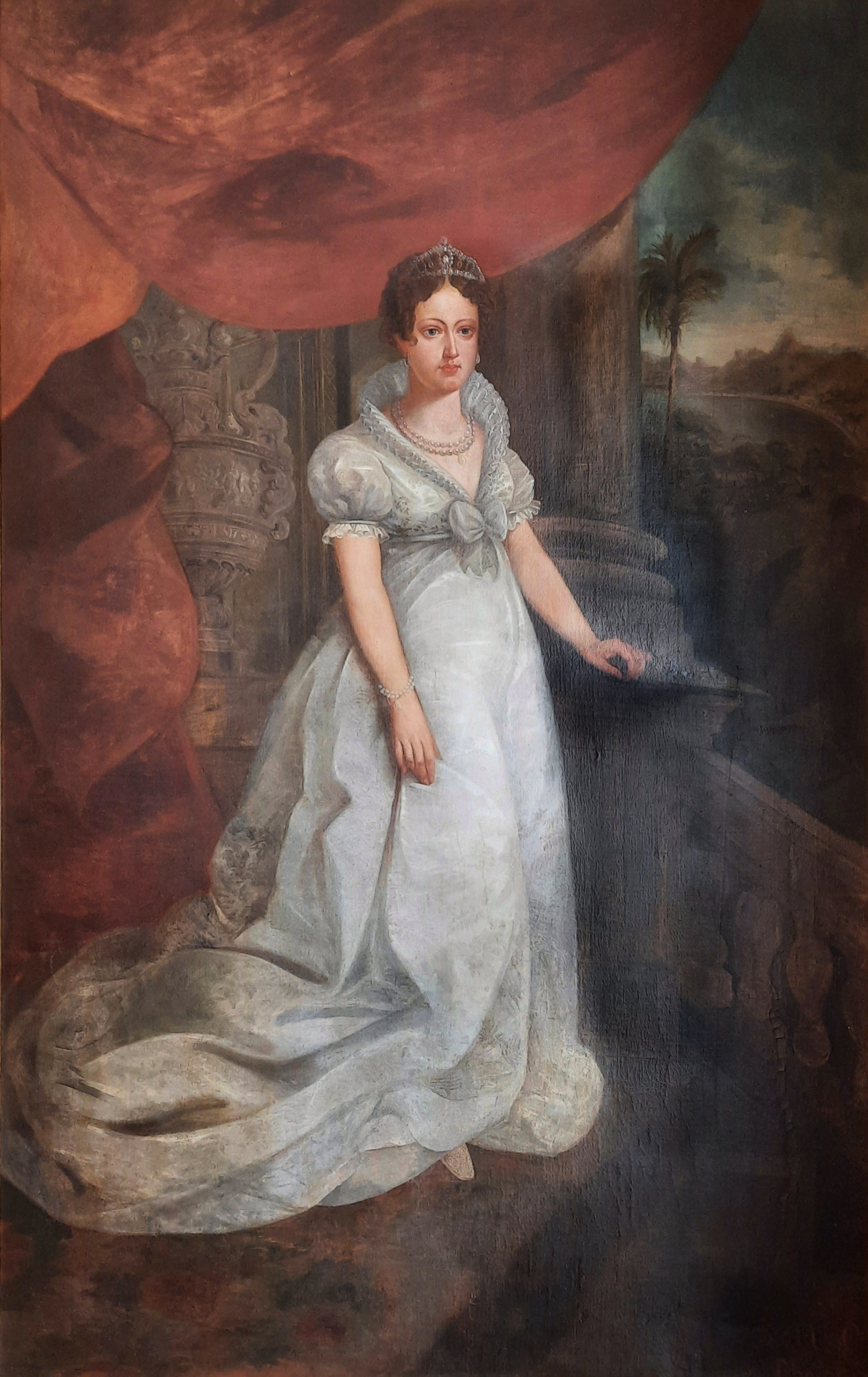
Empress Maria Leopoldina of Brazil wearing a white gown and a white pearls necklace, by Luís Schlappriz

Symphony in White No. 1 – The White Girl, by James McNeill Whistler (1862).

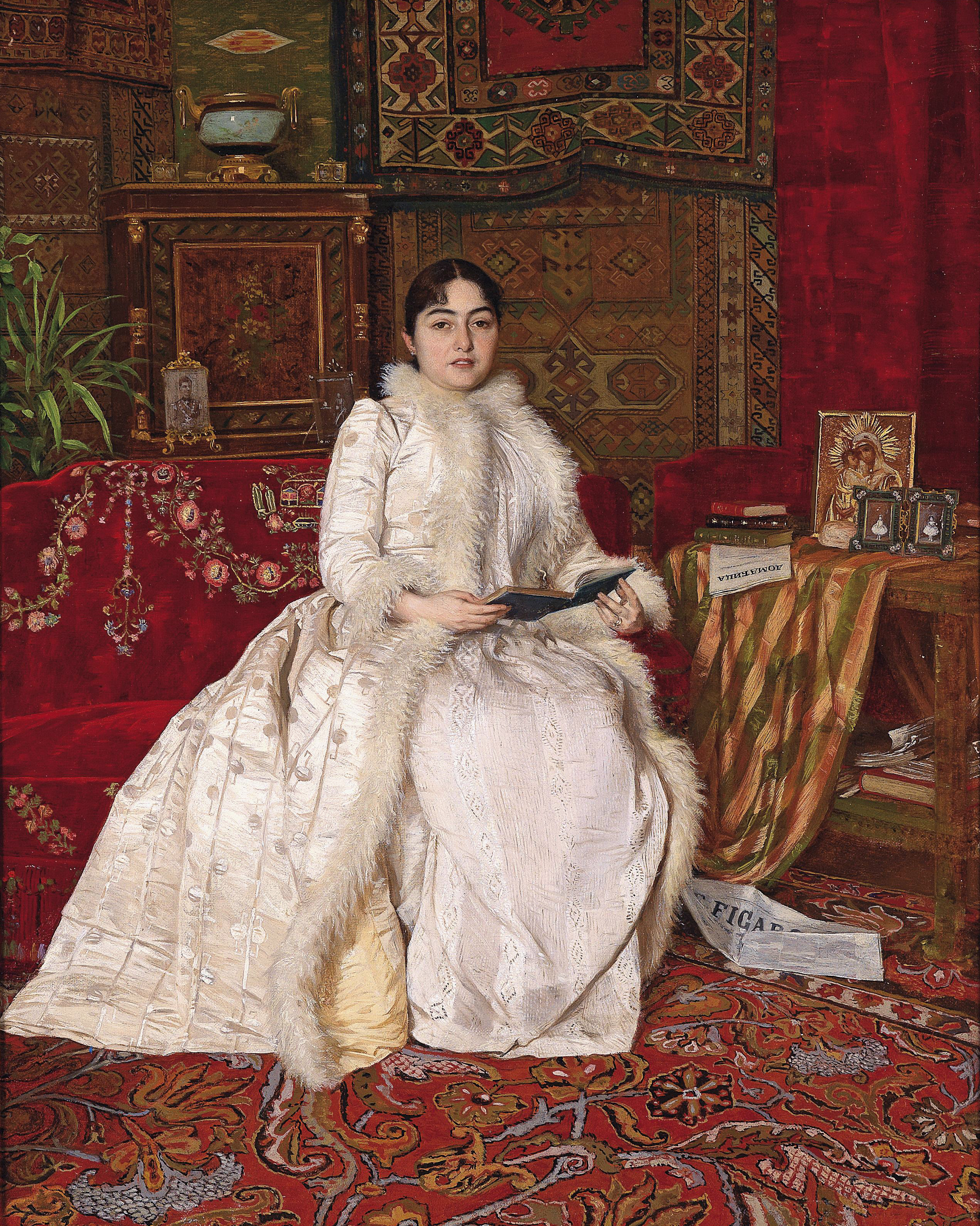
Queen Natalie of Serbia (1890)

==== 20th and 21st centuries ====
The White movement was the opposition that formed against the Bolsheviks during the Russian Civil War, which followed the Russian Revolution in 1917. It was finally defeated by the Bolsheviks in 1921–22, and many of its members emigrated to Europe.

At the end of the 19th century, lead white was still the most popular pigment; but between 1916 and 1918, chemical companies in Norway and the United States began to produce titanium white, made from titanium oxide. It had first been identified in the 18th century by the German chemist Martin Klaproth, who also discovered uranium. It had twice the covering power of lead white, and was the brightest white pigment known. By 1945, 80 percent of the white pigments sold were titanium white.

The absoluteness of white appealed to modernist painters. It was used in its simplest form by the Russian suprematist painter Kazimir Malevich in his 1917 painting 'the white square,' the companion to his earlier 'black square.' It was also used by the Dutch modernist painter Piet Mondrian. His most famous paintings consisted of a pure white canvas with grid of vertical and horizontal black lines and rectangles of primary colors.

Black and white also appealed to modernist architects, such as Le Corbusier (1887–1965). He said a house was "a machine for living in" and called for a "calm and powerful architecture" built of reinforced concrete and steel, without any ornament or frills. Almost all the buildings of contemporary architect Richard Meier, such as his museum in Rome to house the ancient Roman Ara Pacis, or Altar of Peace, are stark white, in the tradition of Le Corbusier.

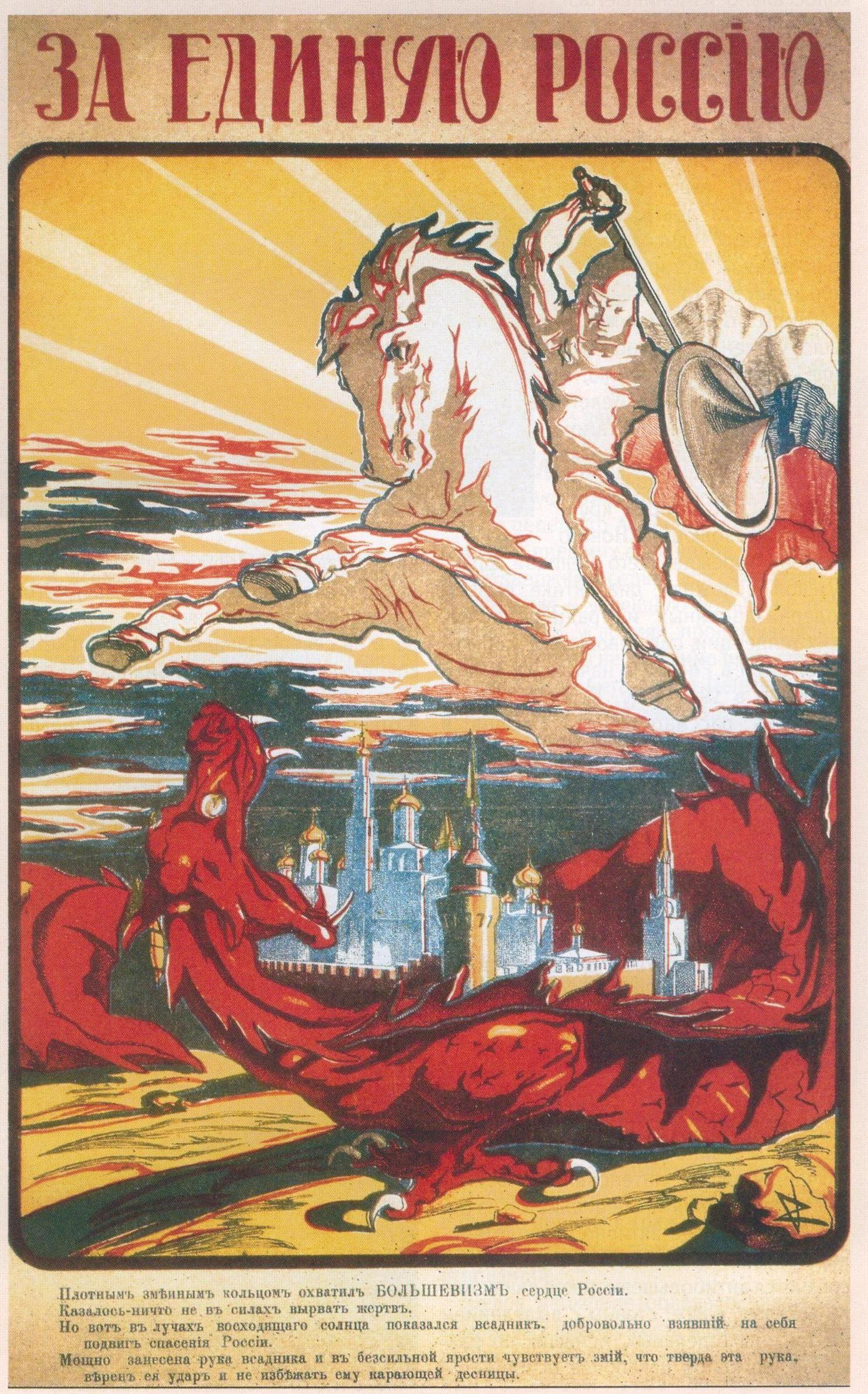
Poster for the White Army during the Russian Civil War (1917–22). The poster says: "for a United Russia."

The Villa Savoye (1928–31) by Le Corbusier; Le Corbusier called for a "calm and powerful" architecture built of steel and reinforced concrete, without color or ornament.

== Scientific understanding (color science) ==
Light is perceived by the human visual system as white when the incoming light to the eye stimulates all three types of color sensitive cone cells in the eye in roughly equal amounts. Materials that do not emit light themselves appear white if their surfaces reflect back most of the light that strikes them in a diffuse way.

=== White light ===
In the RGB color model, used to create colors on TV and computer screens, white is made by mixing red, blue and green light at full intensity.

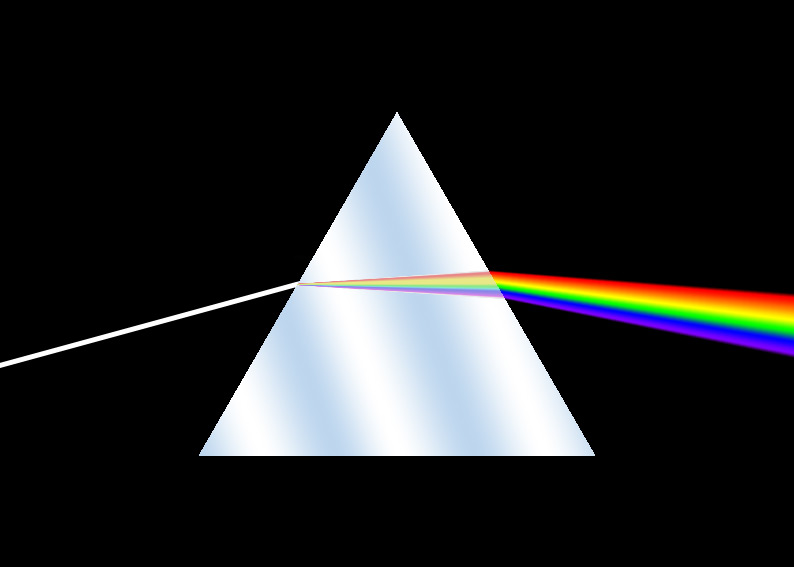
White light refracted in a prism revealing the color components.

In 1666, Isaac Newton demonstrated that white light was composed of multiple colors by passing it through a prism to break it up into components then using a second prism to reassemble them. Before Newton, most scientists believed that white was the fundamental color of light.

In 1878, Edwin Babbitt wrote that the color white is made up of five parts red, three parts yellow, and eight parts blue.

White light can be generated by the sun, by stars, or by earthbound sources such as fluorescent lamps, white LEDs and incandescent bulbs. On the screen of a color television or computer, white is produced by mixing the primary colors of light: red, green and blue (RGB) at full intensity, a process called additive mixing (see image above). White light can be fabricated using light with only two wavelengths, for instance by mixing light from a red and cyan laser or yellow and blue lasers. This light will however have very few practical applications since color rendering of objects will be greatly distorted.

The fact that light sources with vastly different spectral power distributions can result in a similar sensory experience is due to the way the light is processed by the visual system. One color that arises from two different spectral power distributions is called a metamerism.

Many of the light sources that emit white light emit light at almost all visible wavelengths (sun light, incandescent lamps of various Color temperatures). This has led to the notion that white light can be defined as a mixture of "all colors" or "all visible wavelengths".

A range of spectral distributions of light sources can be perceived as white—there is no single, unique specification of "white light". For example, when buying a "white" light bulb, one might buy one labeled 2700K, 6000K, etc., which produce light having very different spectral distributions, and yet this will not prevent the user from identifying the color of objects that those light bulbs illuminate.

=== White objects ===
Color vision allows us to distinguish different objects by their color. In order to do so, color constancy can keep the perceived color of an object relatively unchanged when the illumination changes among various broad (whitish) spectral distributions of light.

The same principle is used in photography and cinematography where the choice of white point determines a transformation of all other color stimuli. Changes in or manipulation of the white point can be used to explain some optical illusions such as The dress.

While there is no single, unique specification of "white light", there is indeed a unique specification of "white object", or, more specifically, "white surface". A perfectly white surface diffusely reflects (scatters) all visible light that strikes it, without absorbing any, irrespective of the light's wavelength or spectral distribution. Since it does not absorb any of the incident light, white is the lightest possible color. If the reflection is not diffuse but rather specular, this describes a mirror rather than a white surface.

Reflection of 100% of incident light at all wavelengths is a form of uniform reflectance, so white is an achromatic color, meaning a color without chroma. The color stimulus produced by the perfect diffuser is usually considered to be an achromatic stimulus for all illuminants, except for those whose light sources appear to be highly chromatic.

Color constancy is achieved by chromatic adaptation. The International Commission on Illumination defines white (adapted) as "a color stimulus that an observer who is [chromatically] adapted to the viewing environment would judge to be perfectly achromatic and to have a luminance factor of unity. The color stimulus that is considered to be the adapted white may be different at different locations within a scene.

== In the natural world ==
=== White features in nature ===
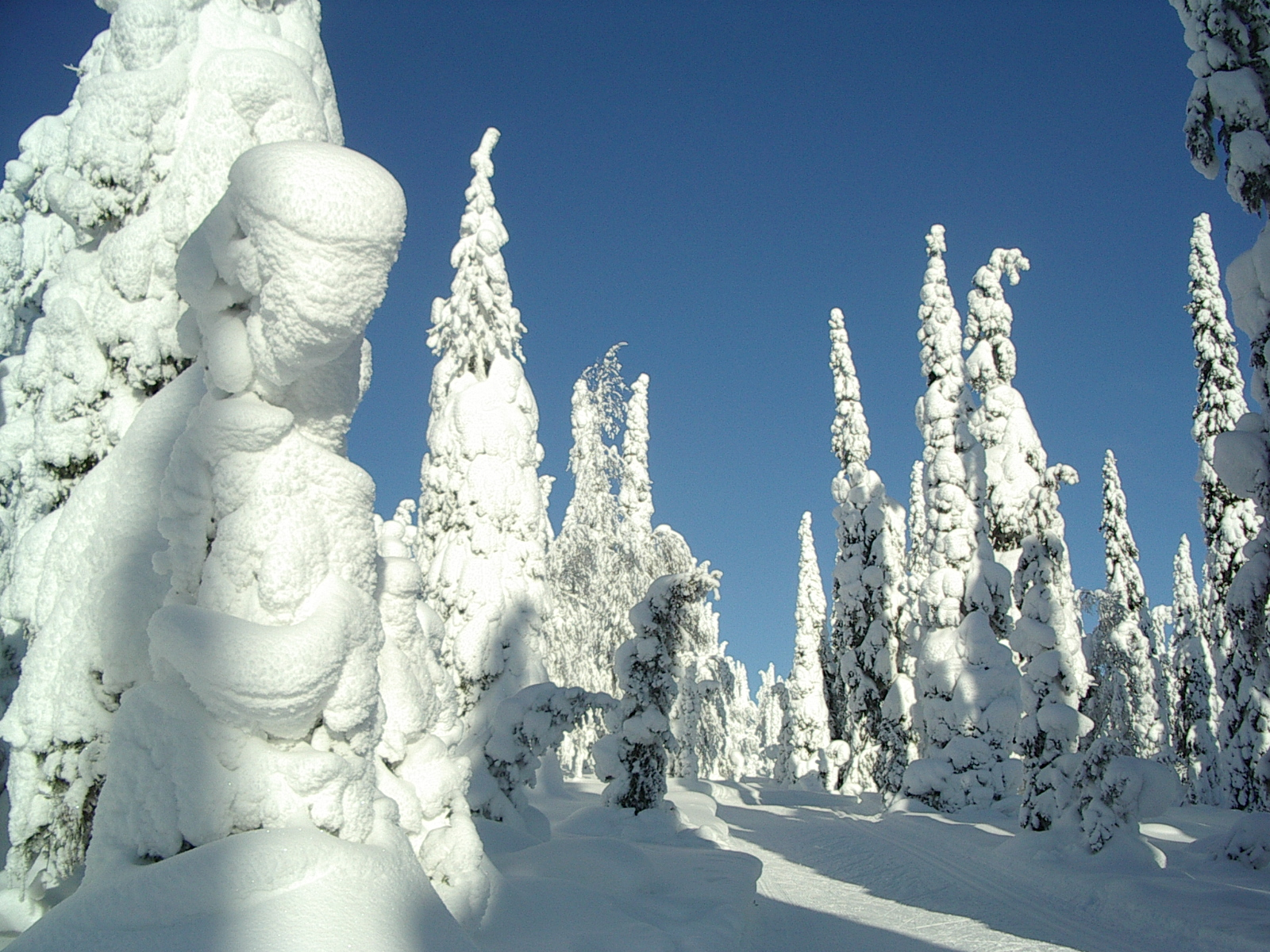
Snow is composed of ice and air; it scatters or reflects sunlight without absorbing other colors of the spectrum.

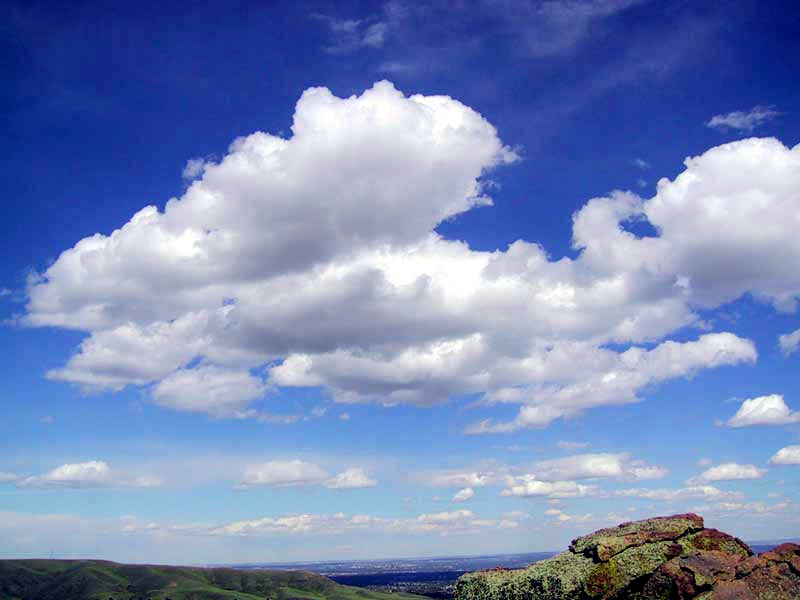
Cumulus clouds look white because the water droplets reflect and scatter the sunlight without absorbing other colors.

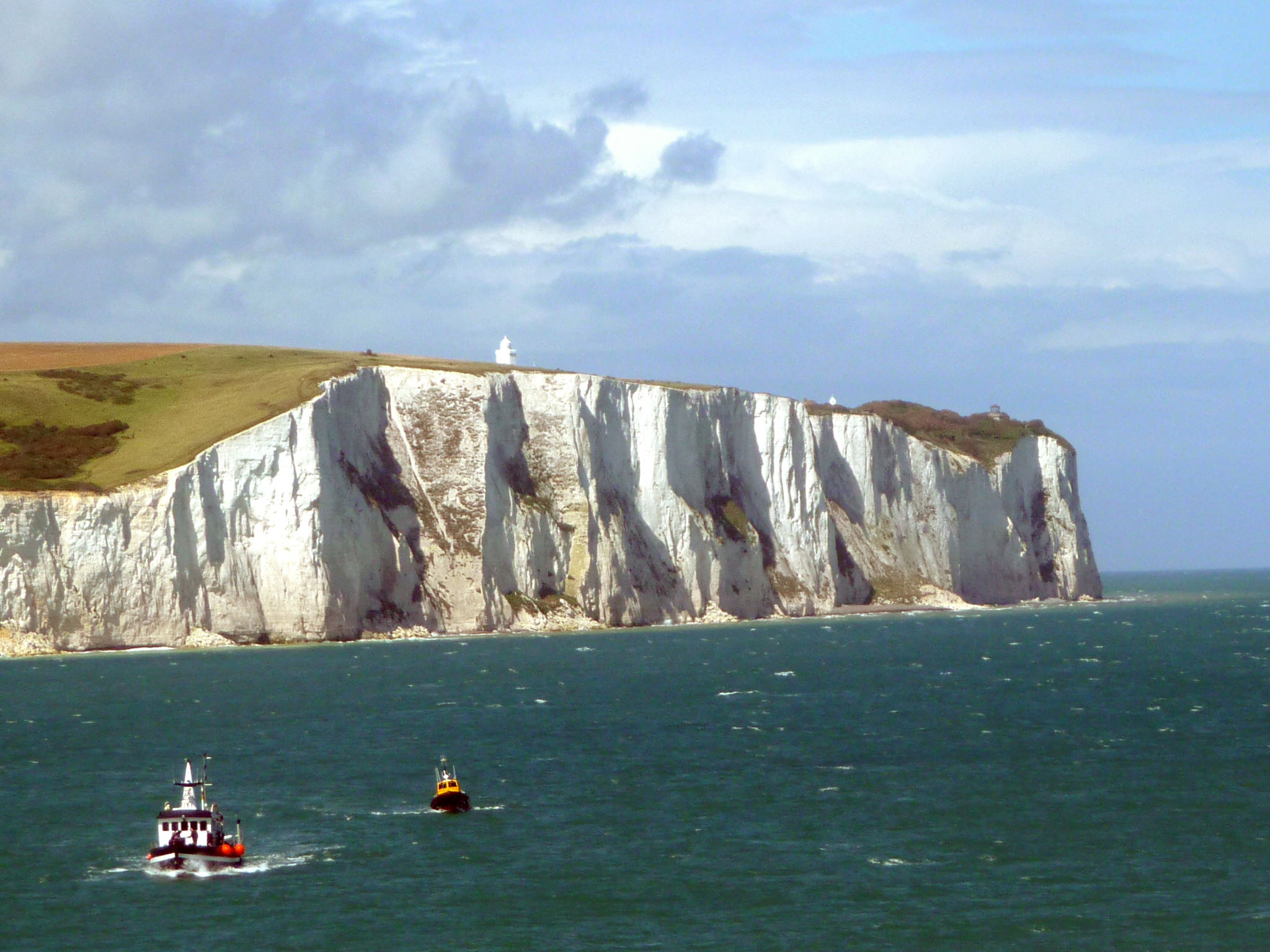
The White Cliffs of Dover, made of limestone

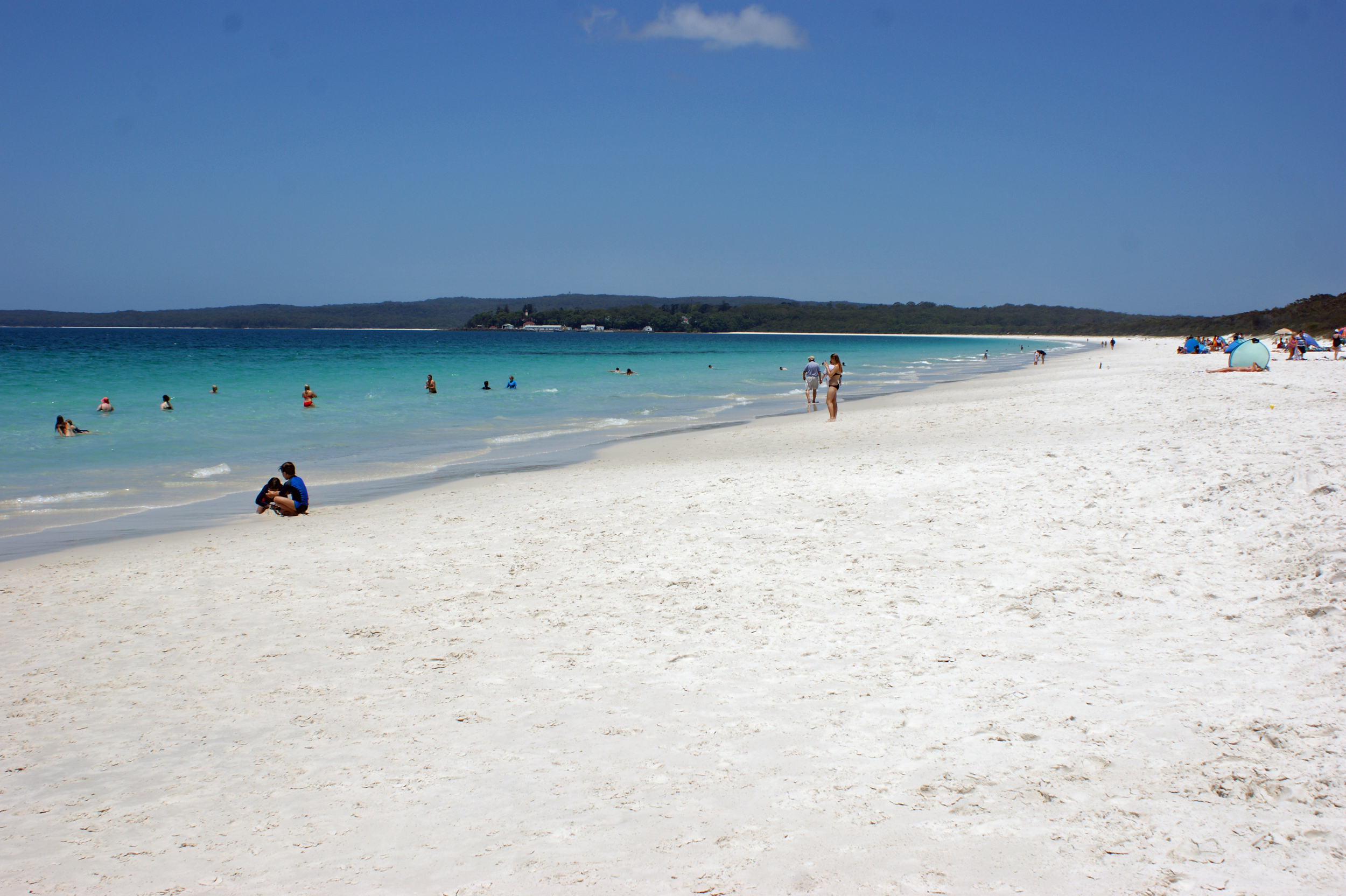
Hyams Beach, New South Wales, appears white because the sunlight is reflected or scattered by the quartz or limestone sand

Beaches with sand containing high amounts of quartz or eroded limestone also appear white, since quartz and limestone reflect or scatter sunlight, rather than absorbing it. Tropical white sand beaches may also have a high quantity of white calcium carbonate from tiny bits of seashells ground to fine sand by the action of the waves.

The White Cliffs of Dover take their white color from the large amount of chalk, made of limestone, which they contain, which reflects the sunlight.

Snow is a mixture of air and tiny ice crystals. When white sunlight enters snow, very little of the spectrum is absorbed; almost all of the light is reflected or scattered by the air and water molecules, so the snow appears to be the color of sunlight, white. Sometimes the light bounces around inside the ice crystals before being scattered, making the snow seem to sparkle.

In the case of glaciers, the ice is more tightly pressed together and contains little air. As sunlight enters the ice, more light of the red spectrum is absorbed, so the light scattered will be bluish.

Clouds are white for the same reason as ice. They are composed of water droplets or ice crystals mixed with air, very little light that strikes them is absorbed, and most of the light is scattered, appearing to the eye as white. Shadows of other clouds above can make clouds look gray, and some clouds have their own shadow on the bottom of the cloud.

Many mountains with winter or year-round snow cover are named accordingly: Mauna Kea means white mountain in Hawaiian, Mont Blanc means white mountain in French. Changbai Mountains literally meaning perpetually white mountains, marks the border between China and Korea.

==== White materials ====
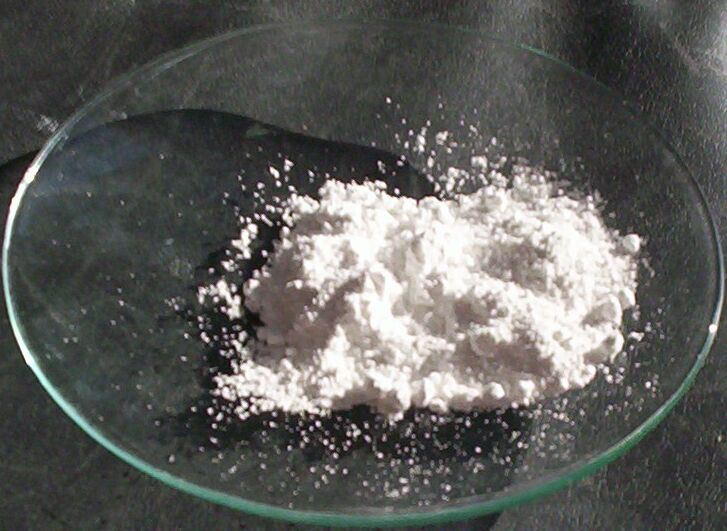
Titanium white, made with titanium dioxide, is the brightest white paint available. It also colors most toothpaste and sunscreen.

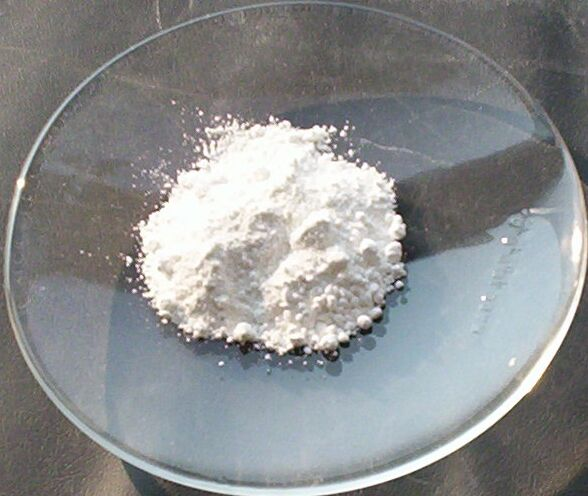
Zinc white is made from zinc oxide. Zinc oxide is used in paints, suntan lotion, and some foods.

Chalk is a type of limestone, made of the mineral calcite, or calcium carbonate. It was originally deposited under the sea as the scales or plates of tiny micro-organisms called Coccolithophore. It was the first white pigment used by prehistoric artists in cave paintings. The chalk used on blackboards today is usually made of gypsum or calcium sulphate, a powder pressed into sticks.

Bianco di San Giovanni is a pigment used in the Renaissance, which was described by the painter Cennino Cennini in the 15th century. It is similar to chalk, made of calcium carbonate with calcium hydroxide. It was made of dried lime which was made into a powder, then soaked in water for eight days, with the water changed each day. It was then made into cakes and dried in the sun.

Lead white was being produced during the 4th century BC; the process was described by Pliny the Elder, Vitruvius, and the ancient Greek author Theophrastus. Pieces of lead were put into clay pots which had a separate compartment filled with vinegar. The pots were in turn piled on shelves close to cow dung. The combined fumes of the vinegar and the cow dung caused the lead to corrode into lead carbonate. It was a slow process which could take a month or more. It made an excellent white and was used by artists for centuries, but it was also toxic. It was replaced in the 19th century by zinc white and titanium white.

Titanium white is the most popular white for artists today; it is the brightest available white pigment, and has twice the coverage of lead white. It first became commercially available in 1921. It is made out of titanium dioxide, from the minerals brookite, anatase, rutile, or ilmenite, currently the major source. Because of its brilliant whiteness, it is used as a colorant for most toothpaste and sunscreen.

Zinc white is made from zinc oxide. It is similar to but not as opaque as titanium white. It is added to some foods to enrich them with zinc, an important nutrient. Chinese white is a variety of zinc white made for artists.

Some materials can be made to look "whiter than white", this is achieved using optical brightener agents (OBA). These are chemical compounds that absorb light in the ultraviolet and violet region (usually 340–370 nm) of the electromagnetic spectrum, and re-emit light in the blue region (typically 420–470 nm). OBAs are often used in paper and clothing to create an impression of very bright white. This is due to the fact that the materials actually send out more visible light than they receive.

==== Bleach and bleaching ====
Bleaching is a fabric whitening process that has been practiced for thousands of years. Sometimes it was simply a matter of leaving the fabric in the sun, to be faded by the bright light. In the 18th century several scientists developed varieties of chlorine bleach, including sodium hypochlorite and calcium hypochlorite (bleaching powder). Bleaching agents that do not contain chlorine most often are based on peroxides, such as hydrogen peroxide, sodium percarbonate and sodium perborate. While most bleaches are oxidizing agents, a fewer number are reducing agents such as sodium dithionite.

Bleaches attack the chromophores, the part of a molecule which absorbs light and causes fabrics to have different colors. An oxidizing bleach works by breaking the chemical bonds that make up the chromophore. This changes the molecule into a different substance that either does not contain a chromophore, or contains a chromophore that does not absorb visible light. A reducing bleach works by converting double bonds in the chromophore into single bonds. This eliminates the ability of the chromophore to absorb visible light.

Sunlight acts as a bleach through a similar process. High energy photons of light, often in the violet or ultraviolet range, can disrupt the bonds in the chromophore, rendering the resulting substance colorless.

Some detergents go one step further; they contain fluorescent chemicals that glow, making the fabric look literally whiter than white.

=== Astronomy ===
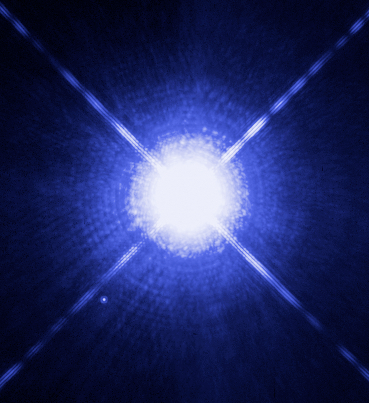
Image of Sirius A and Sirius B taken by the Hubble Space Telescope. Sirius B, a white dwarf, is the faint pinprick of light to the lower left of the much brighter Sirius A.

A white dwarf is a stellar remnant composed mostly of electron-degenerate matter. They are very dense; a white dwarf's mass is comparable to that of the Sun and its volume is comparable to that of the Earth. Its faint luminosity comes from the emission of stored thermal energy. A white dwarf is very hot when it is formed, but since it has no source of energy, it will gradually radiate away its energy and cool down. This means that its radiation, which initially has a high color temperature, will lessen and redden with time. Over a very long time, a white dwarf will cool to temperatures at which it will no longer emit significant heat or light, and it will become a cold black dwarf. However, since no white dwarf can be older than the Age of the universe (approximately 13.8 billion years), even the oldest white dwarfs still radiate at temperatures of a few thousand kelvins, and no black dwarfs are thought to exist yet.

An A-type main-sequence star (A V) or A dwarf star is a main-sequence (hydrogen-burning) star of spectral type A and luminosity class V. These stars have spectra which are defined by strong hydrogen Balmer absorption lines. They have masses from 1.4 to 2.1 times the mass of the Sun and surface temperatures between 7600 and 11 500 K.

=== Biology ===
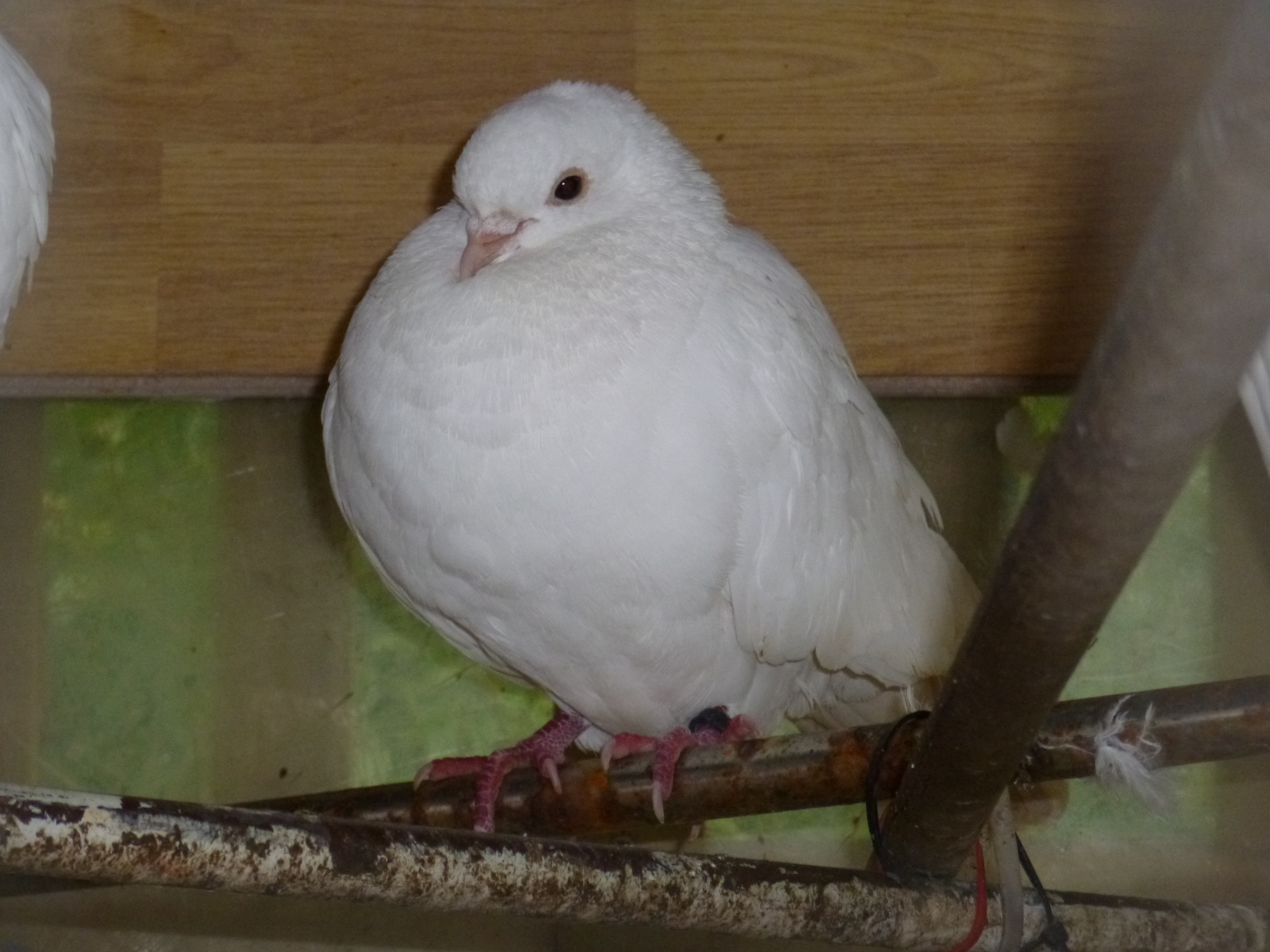
The dove is an international symbol of peace.

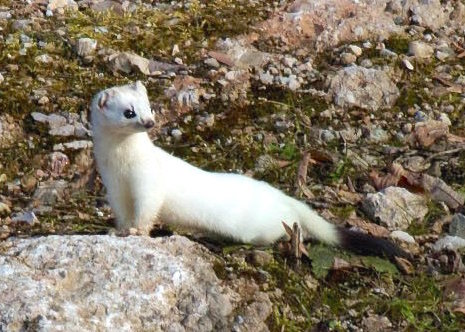
The ermine, or stoat. Once considered the most noble of animals because it would rather die than dirty its fur.

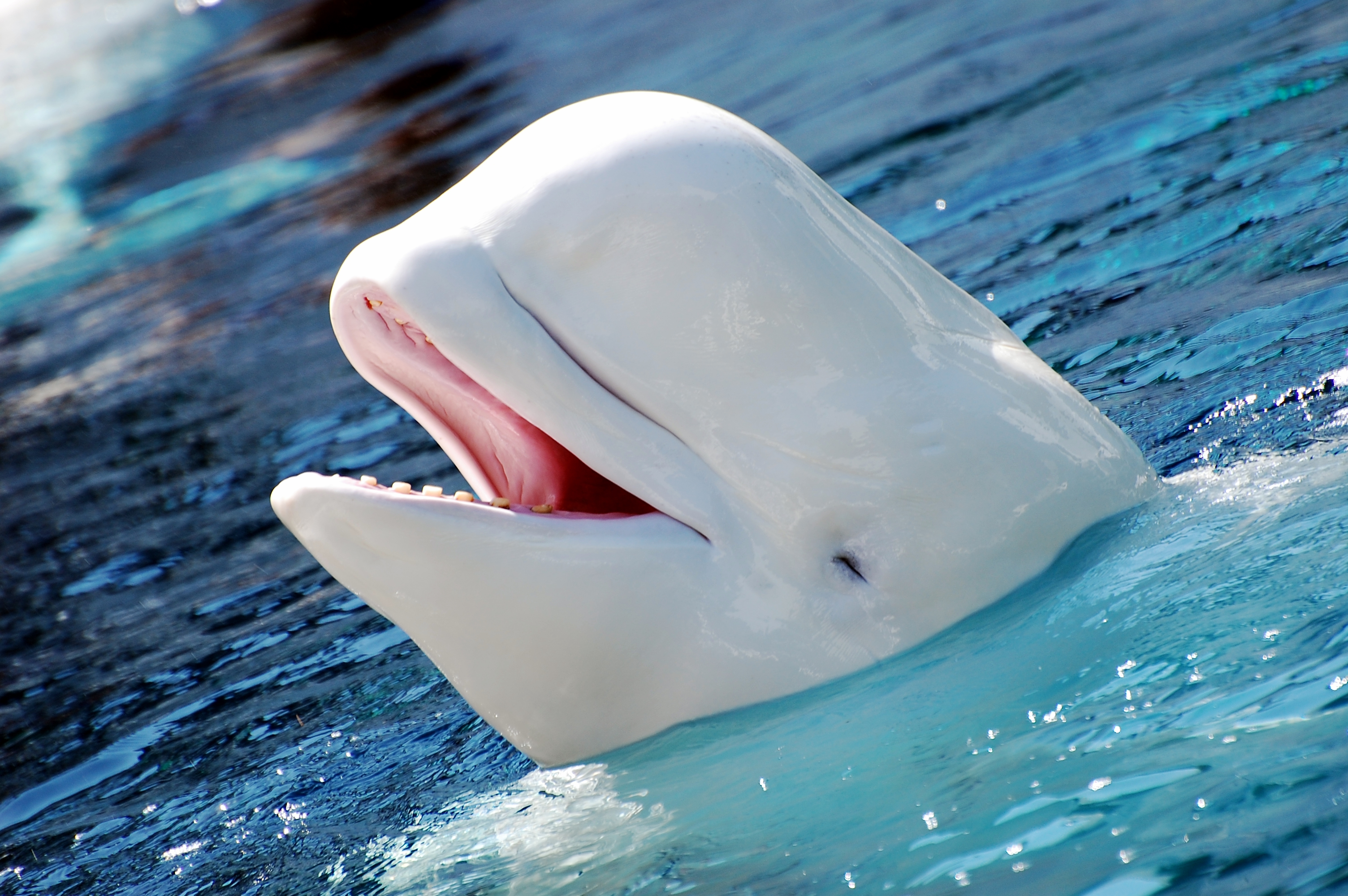
The beluga whale lives in Arctic and sub-arctic waters, where its color is an effective camouflage

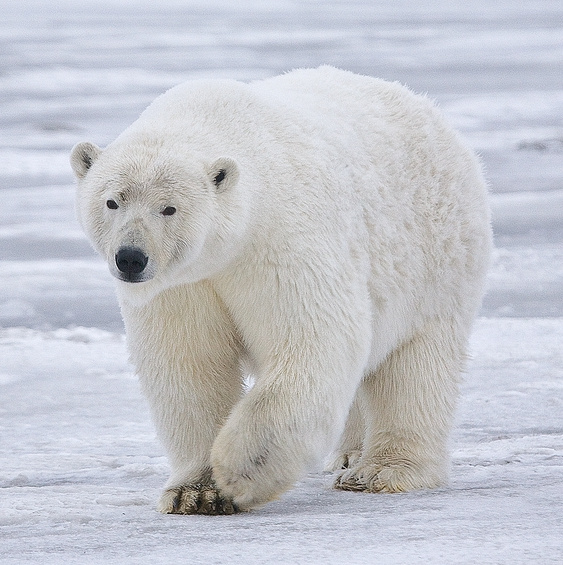
A polar bear in Alaska. Its color is a form of camouflage

White animals use their color as a form of camouflage in winter. Animals such as penguins are countershaded with white bellies, again as camouflage.

== Religion and culture ==
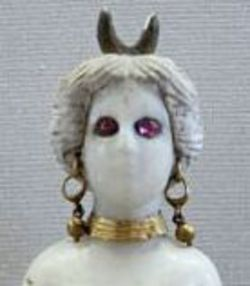
Statuette of the goddess Astarte.

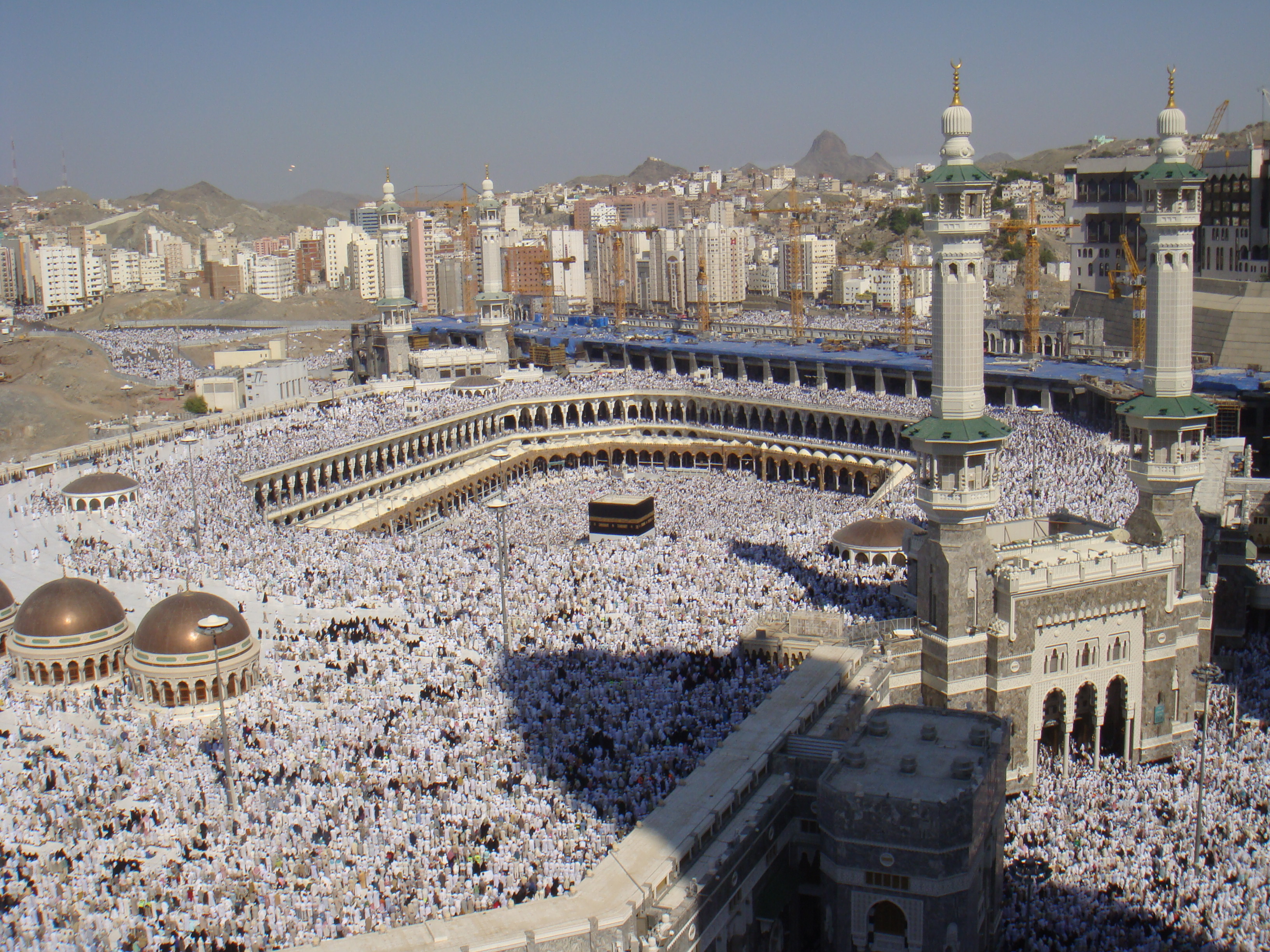
Thousands of pilgrims in white gather in Mecca for the beginning of their pilgrimage, or Hajj.

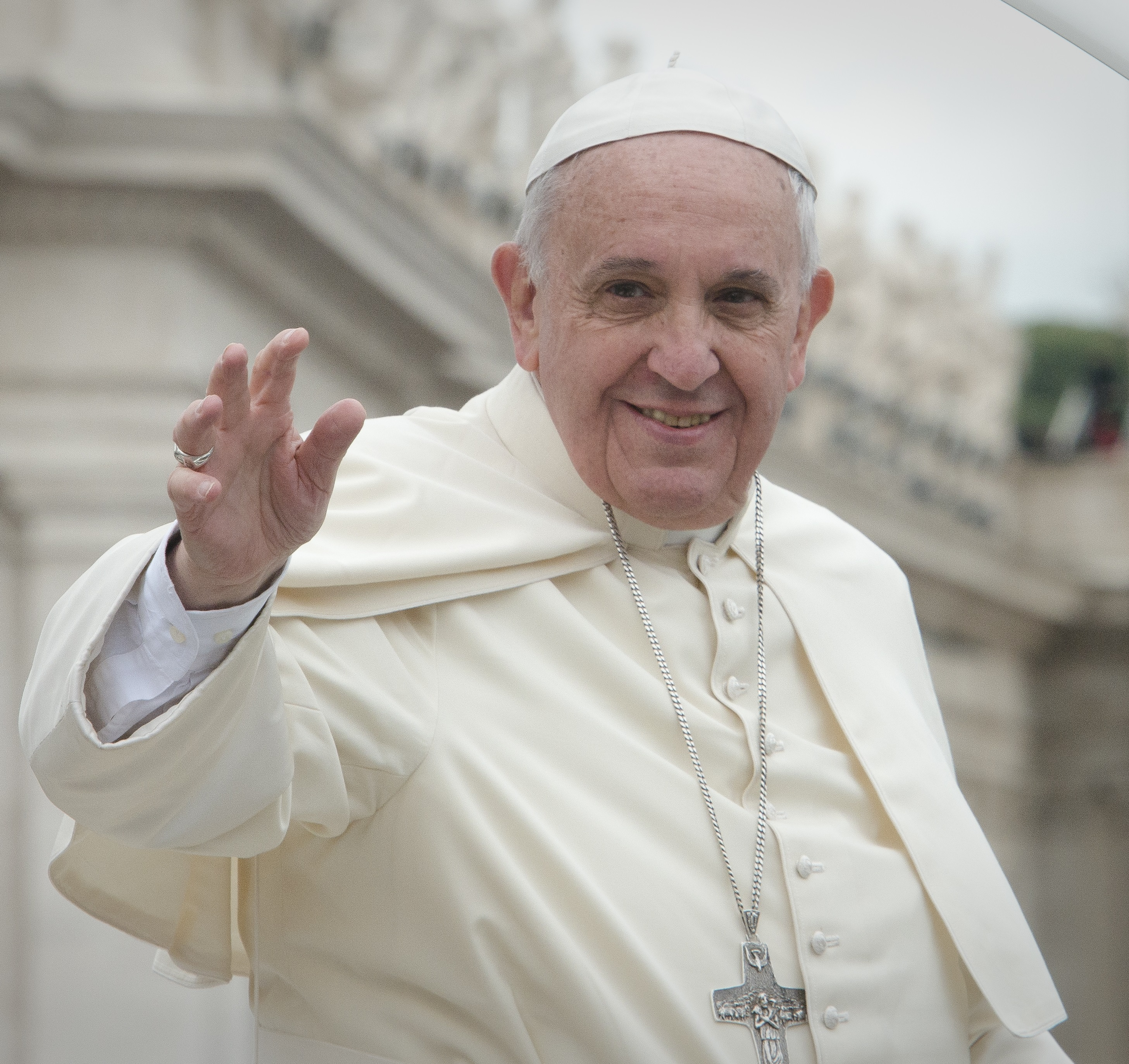
Pope Francis at the Vatican. Popes have traditionally worn white since 1566.

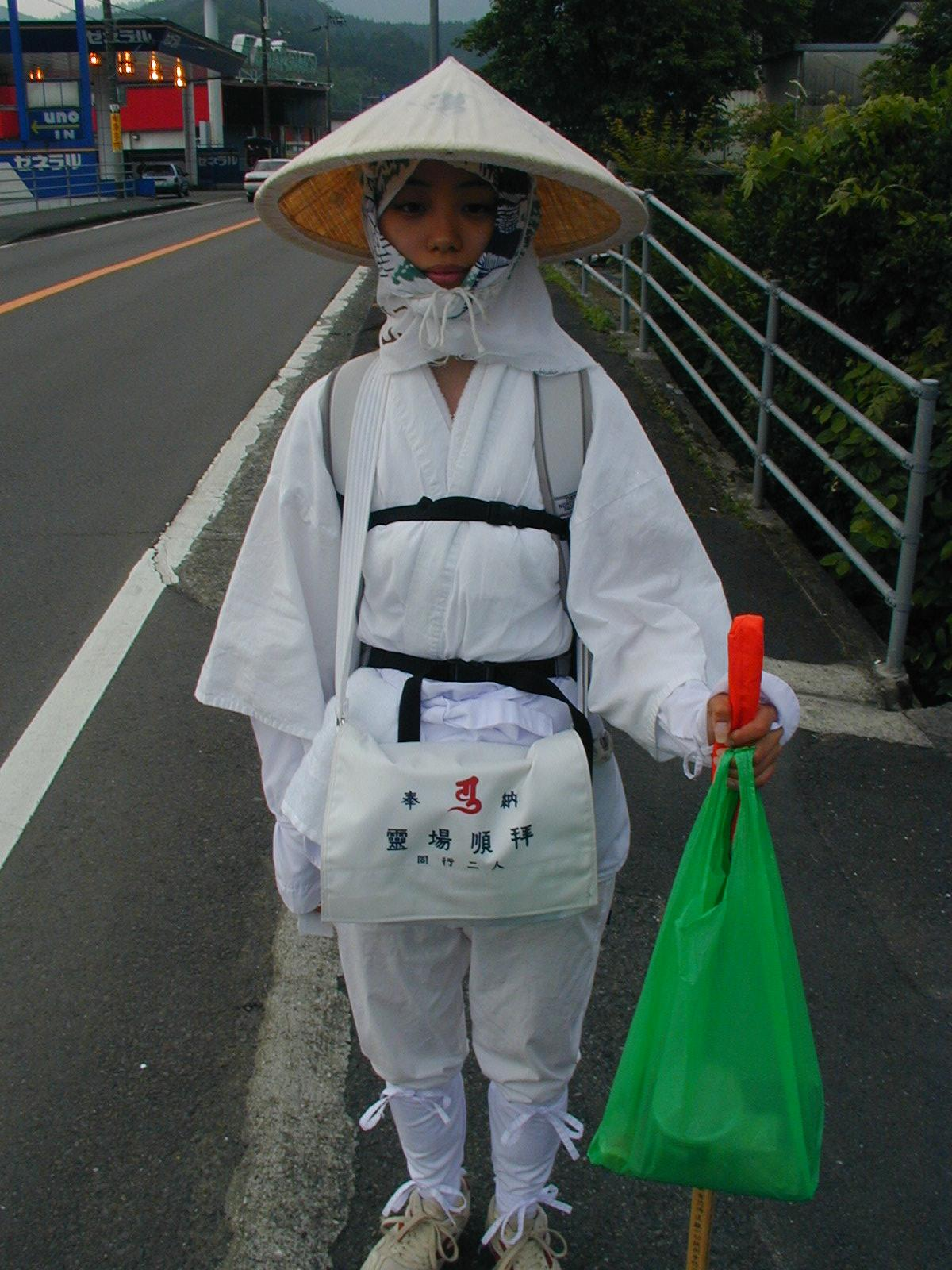
A pilgrim in Japan.

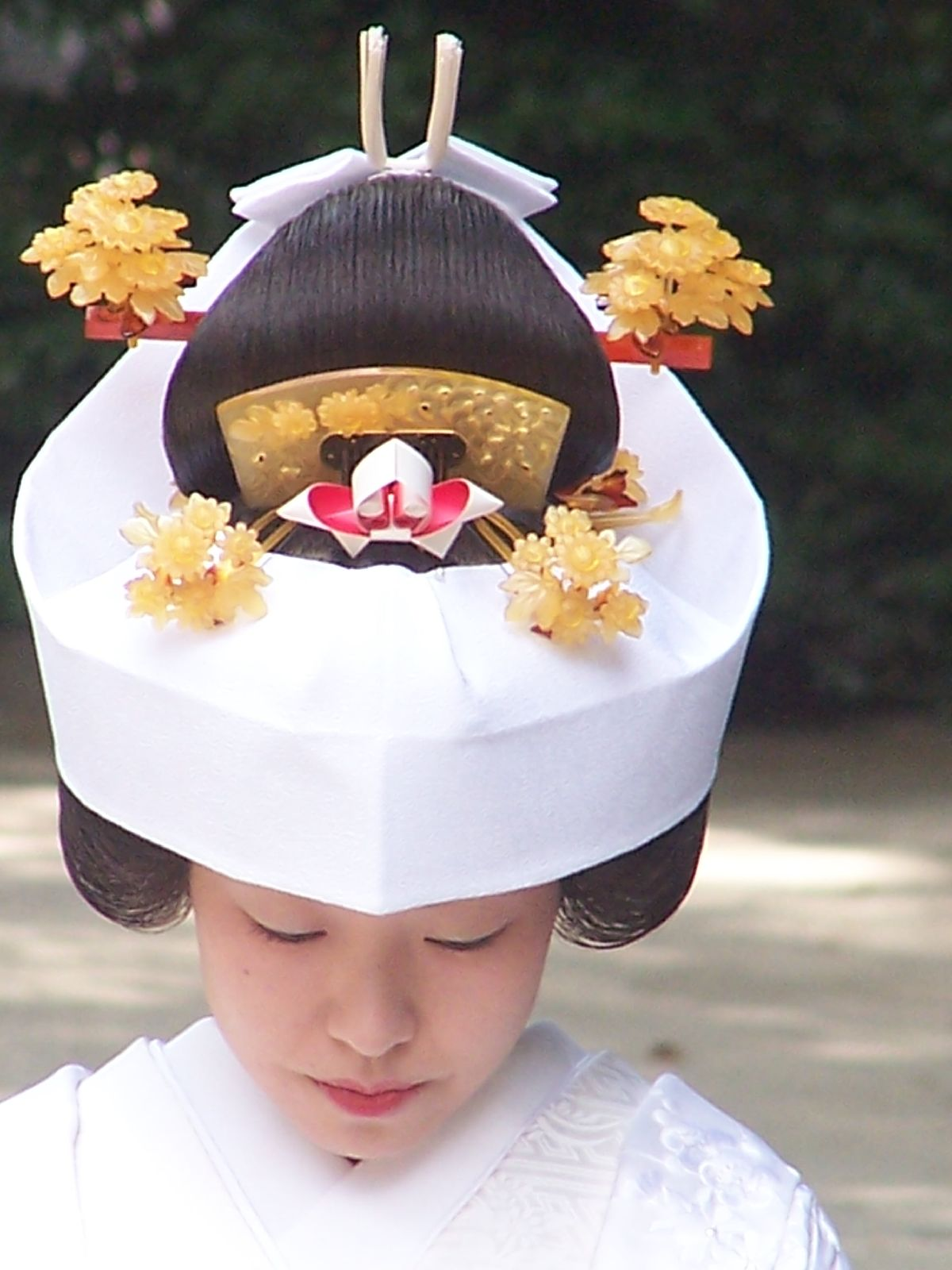
In the Shinto religion of Japan brides traditionally wear a white wedding kimono.

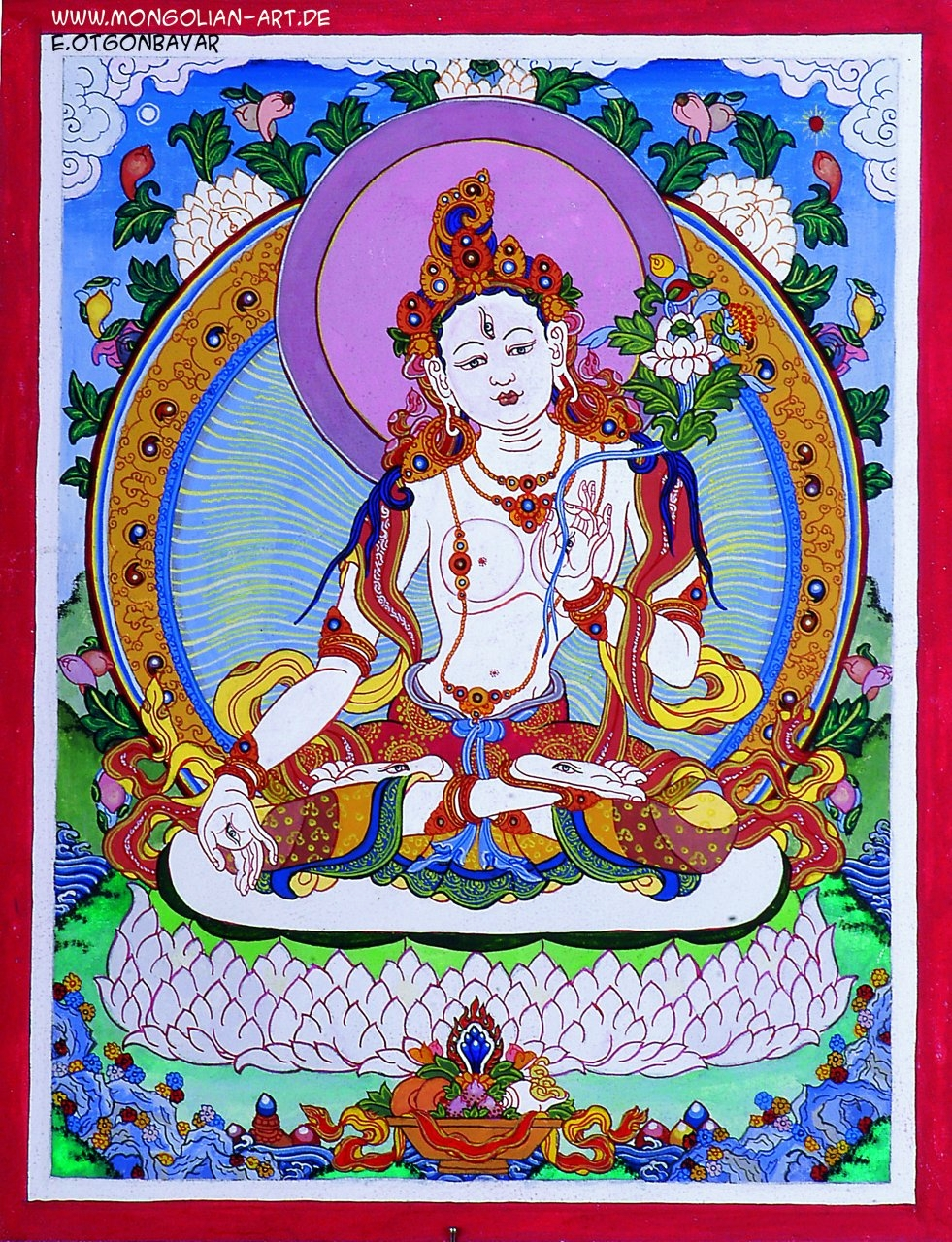
The Buddhist deity Tara is often depicted with white skin.

White is an important symbolic color in most religions and cultures, usually because of its association with purity.

In Christianity, white symbolizes purity, wisdom, holiness or devotion to God. According to the Bible, Jesus is described wearing white cloths after resurrection, symbolizing life, and also describes the hair of God as whiter than snow, symbolizing purity. In Christianity, White also symbolizes light. White is mentioned 70 times in the KJV Bible.

In the Roman Catholic Church, white is associated with Jesus Christ, innocence and sacrifice. Since the Middle Ages, priests wear a white cassock in many of the most important ceremonies and religious services connected with events in the life of Christ. White is worn by priests at Christmas, during Easter, and during celebrations connected with the other events of the life of Christ, such as Corpus Christi Sunday, and Trinity Sunday. It is also worn at the services dedicated to the Virgin Mary, and to those Saints who were not martyred, as well as other special occasions, such as the ordination of priests and the installation of new bishops. Within the hierarchy of the church, lighter colors indicated higher rank; ordinary priests wore black; bishops wore violet, cardinals wore red, and outside a church, only the pope would wear white. (Popes occasionally wore white in the Middle Ages, but usually wore red. Popes have worn white regularly since 1566, when Pope Pius V, a member of the Dominican Order, began the practice.) White is the color of the Dominican Order.

In the Church of Jesus Christ of Latter-day Saints the color white is used as a symbol of purity, innocence, and cleanliness, particularly in religious ceremonies such as baptism and temple ceremonies. In temple ceremonies, white clothing is also worn by all participants, both men and women, to also symbolize unity and equality before God.

In Islam, white clothing is worn during required pilgrimage to Mecca, or Ihram pilgrimage (Hajj). Called Ihram clothing, men's garments often consist of two white un-hemmed sheets (usually towelling material). The top (the riḍā) is draped over the torso and the bottom (the izār) is secured by a belt; plus a pair of sandals. Women's clothing varies considerably and reflects regional as well as religious influences. Ihram is typically worn during Dhu al-Hijjah, the last month in the Islamic calendar.

White also has a long history of use as a religious and political symbol in Islam, beginning with the white banner that tradition ascribes to the Quraysh, the tribe to which Muhammad belonged. The Umayyad dynasty also used white as its dynastic color, following the personal banner of its founder, Mu'awiya I, while the Shi'ite Fatimids also chose white to highlight their opposition to the Sunni Abbasid Caliphate, whose color was black.

In Judaism, during the rituals of Yom Kippur, the ceremony of atonement, the rabbi dresses in white, as do the members of the congregation, to restore the bonds between God and his followers.

In the traditional Japanese religion of Shinto, an area of white gravel or stones marks a sacred place, called a niwa. These places were dedicated to the kami, spirits which had descended from the heavens or had come across the sea. Later, temples of Zen Buddhism in Japan often featured a Zen garden, where white sand or gravel was carefully raked to resemble rivers or streams, designed as objects of meditation.

Many religions symbolize heaven by using a sky with white clouds. This phenomenon is not limited to western culture; in Yoruba religion, the orisha Obatala in the Ifá tradition is represented by white. Obatala is associated with calmness, morality, old age, and purity.

In Theosophy and similar religions, the deities called the Great White Brotherhood are said to have white auras.

In some Asian and Slavic cultures, white is considered to be a color that represents death. White also represented death in ancient Egypt, representing the lifeless desert that covered much of the country; black was held to be the color of life, representing the mud-covered fertile lands created by the flooding of the Nile and giving the country its name (Kemet, or "black land").

In China, Korea, and some other Asian countries, white, or more precisely, the whitish color of undyed linen, is the color of mourning and funerals.

In traditional China, undyed linen clothing is worn at funerals. As time passes, the bereaved can gradually wear clothing dyed with colors, then with darker colors. Small sacks of quicklime, one for each year of the life of the deceased are placed around the body to protect it against impurity in the next world, and white paper flowers are placed around the body.

In China and other Asian countries, white is the color of reincarnation, showing that death is not a permanent separation from the world.

In China, white is associated with the masculine (the yang of the yin and yang); with the unicorn and tiger; with the fur of an animal; with the direction of west; with the element metal; and with the autumn season.

In Japan, undyed linen white robes are worn by pilgrims for rituals of purification, and bathing in sacred rivers. In the mountains, pilgrims wear costumes of undyed jute to symbolize purity. A white kimono is often placed in the casket with the deceased for the journey to the other world, as white represents death sometimes. Condolence gifts, or kooden, are tied with black and white ribbons and wrapped in white paper, protecting the contents from the impurities of the other world.

In India, it is the color of purity, divinity, detachment and serenity. In Hindi, the name Sweta means white.

In Tibetan Buddhism, white robes were reserved for the lama of a monastery.

In the Bedouin and some other pastoral cultures, there is a strong connection between milk and white, which is considered the color of gratitude, esteem, joy, good fortune and fertility.

In Paganism, it is used for peace, innocence, illumination, and purity. It can also be used to stand for any color. White is also associated with cleansing, a Pagan practice that cleans something using the elements. In Wicca, a white-handled knife called the boline is used in rituals.

=== Political movements ===
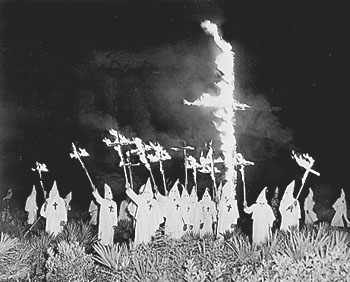
A cross burning by the white supremacist hate group Ku Klux Klan in Florida in 1922.

White is often associated with monarchism. The association originally came from the white flag of the Bourbon dynasty of France. White became the banner of the royalist rebellions against the French Revolution (see Revolt in the Vendée).

During the Civil War which followed the Russian Revolution of 1917, the White Army, a coalition of monarchists, nationalists and liberals, fought unsuccessfully against the Red Army of the Bolsheviks. A similar battle between reds and whites took place during the Civil War in Finland in the same period.

The Ku Klux Klan is a racist and anti-immigrant organization which flourished in the Southern United States after the American Civil War. They wore white robes and hoods, burned crosses and violently attacked and murdered black Americans.

In Iran, the White Revolution was a series of social and political reforms launched in 1963 by the last Shah of Iran before his downfall.

White is also associated with peace and passive resistance. The white ribbon is worn by movements denouncing violence against women and the White Rose was a non-violent resistance group in Nazi Germany.

=== Selected national flags featuring white ===
White is a common color in national flags, though its symbolism varies widely. The white in the flag of the United States and flag of the United Kingdom comes from traditional red St George's Cross on a white background of the historic flag of England. The white in the flag of France represents either the monarchy or "white, the ancient French color" according to the Marquis de Lafayette.

Many flags in the Arab world use the colors of the flag of the Arab Revolt of 1916; red, white, green and black. These include the flags of Egypt, Palestine, Jordan, Syria, Kuwait and Iraq.

The Philippines also use white as their symbol for unity in their flag.

Flag of the Bourbons, royal family of France until the French Revolution and during the restoration of the monarchy afterwards.

The Flag of Vatican City (1929). The white and gold colors symbolize the colors of the keys to heaven given by Jesus Christ to Saint Peter: the gold of spiritual power, the white of worldly power. The keys have been the Papal symbol since the 13th century.

The flag of the Netherlands (1572) was the first red, white and blue national flag. Peter the Great adopted the colors for the flag of Russia.

The flag of India (1947). White represents "light, the path of truth".

The flag of Ireland. According to the Irish government press office, citing Thomas Francis Meagher, "The green represents the older Gaelic tradition while the orange represents the supporters of William of Orange. The white in the centre signifies a lasting truce between Orange and Green".

=== Idioms and expressions ===
- To whitewash something is to conceal an unpleasant reality.
- A white lie is an innocent lie told out of politeness.
- White noise is the noise of all the frequencies of sound combined. It is used to cover up unwanted noise.
- A white knight in finance is a friendly investor who steps in to rescue a company from a hostile takeover.
- White-collar workers are those who work in offices, as opposed to blue-collar workers, who work with their hands in factories or workshops.
- A white paper is an authoritative report on a major issue by a team of experts; a government report outlining policy; or a short treatise whose purpose is to educate industry customers. Associating a paper with white may signify clean facts and unbiased information.
- The white feather is a symbol of cowardice, particularly in Britain. It supposedly comes from cockfighting and the belief that a cockerel sporting a white feather in its tail is likely to be a poor fighter. At the beginning of the First World War, women in England were encouraged to give white feathers to men who had not enlisted in the British Armed Forces.
- In the US, a white shoe firm is an older, conservative firm, usually in a field such as banking or law. The phrase derives from the "white bucks", laced suede or buckskin shoes with red soles, long popular in the Ivy League colleges.
- In Russia, the nobility are sometimes described as white bone (белая кость, bélaya kost'), commoners as black bone.

== Associations and symbolism ==
=== Innocence and sacrifice ===
In Western culture, white is the color most often associated with innocence, or purity. In the Bible and in Temple Judaism, white animals such as lambs were sacrificed to expiate sins. The white lily is considered the flower of purity and innocence, and is often associated with the Virgin Mary.

=== Beginnings ===
White is the color in Western culture most often associated with beginnings. In Christianity, children are baptized and first take communion wearing white. Christ after the Resurrection is traditionally portrayed dressed in white.

Queen Elizabeth II wore white when she opened each session of British Parliament. In high society, debutantes traditionally wear white for their first ball.

=== Weddings ===
White has long been the traditional color worn by brides at royal weddings, but the white wedding gown for ordinary people appeared in the 19th century. Before that time, most brides wore their best Sunday clothing, of whatever color. The white lace wedding gown of Queen Victoria in 1840 had a large impact on the color and fashion of wedding dresses in both Europe and America down to the present day.

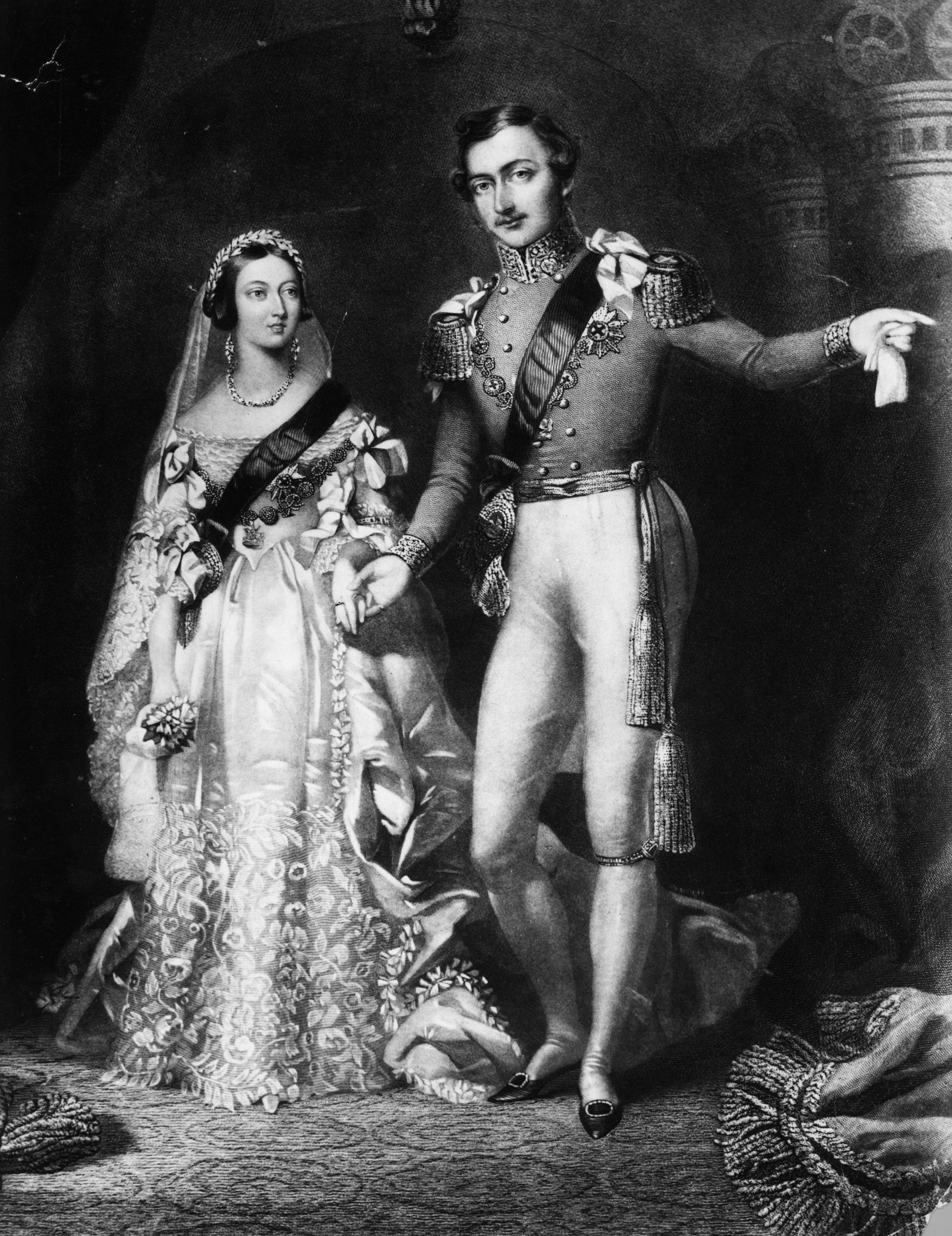
The wedding dress of Queen Victoria (1840) set the fashion for wedding dresses of the Victorian era and for the 20th century.

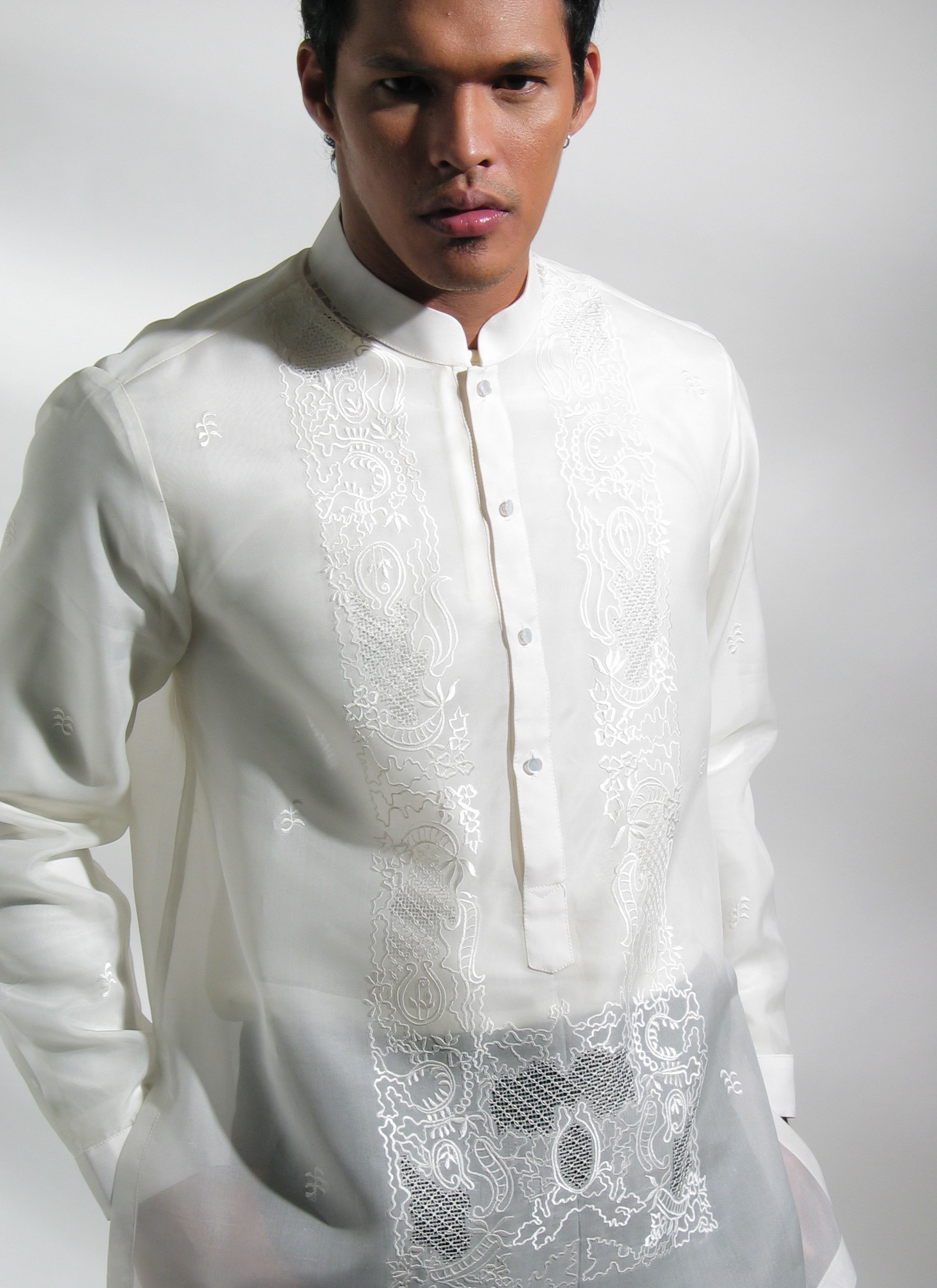
The barong tagalog is a traditional folk costume of the Philippines; this attire is worn on formal gatherings and weddings.

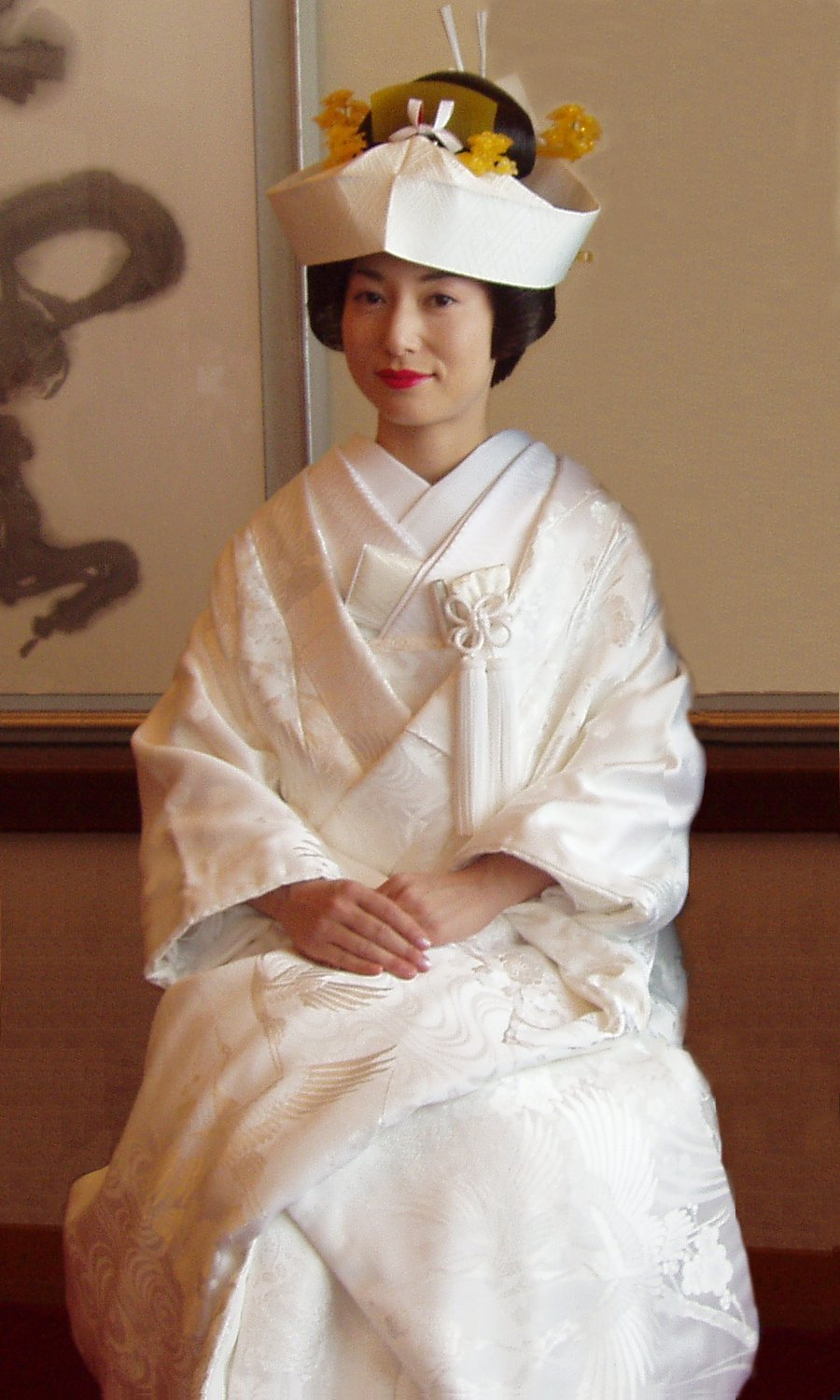
Japanese formal wedding dress still used today.

=== Cleanliness ===
White is the color most associated with cleanliness. Objects which are expected to be clean, such as refrigerators and dishes, toilets and sinks, bed linen and towels, are traditionally white. White was the traditional color of the coats of doctors, nurses, scientists and laboratory technicians, though nowadays a pale blue or green is often used. White is also the color most often worn by chefs, bakers, and butchers, and the color of the aprons of waiters in French restaurants.

=== Ghosts, phantoms and two of the Four Horsemen of the Apocalypse ===
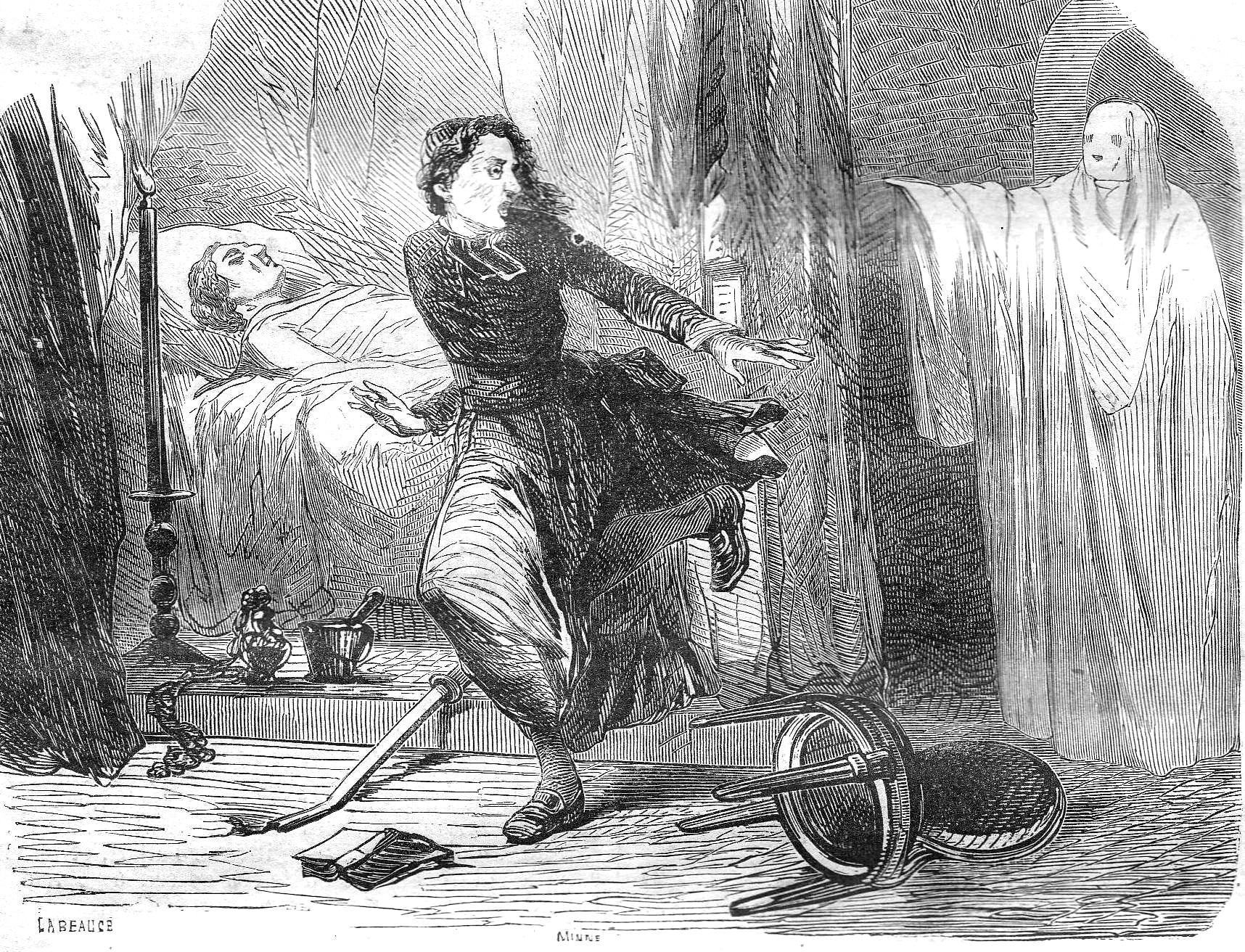
The woman in white, a familiar figure in European ghost stories

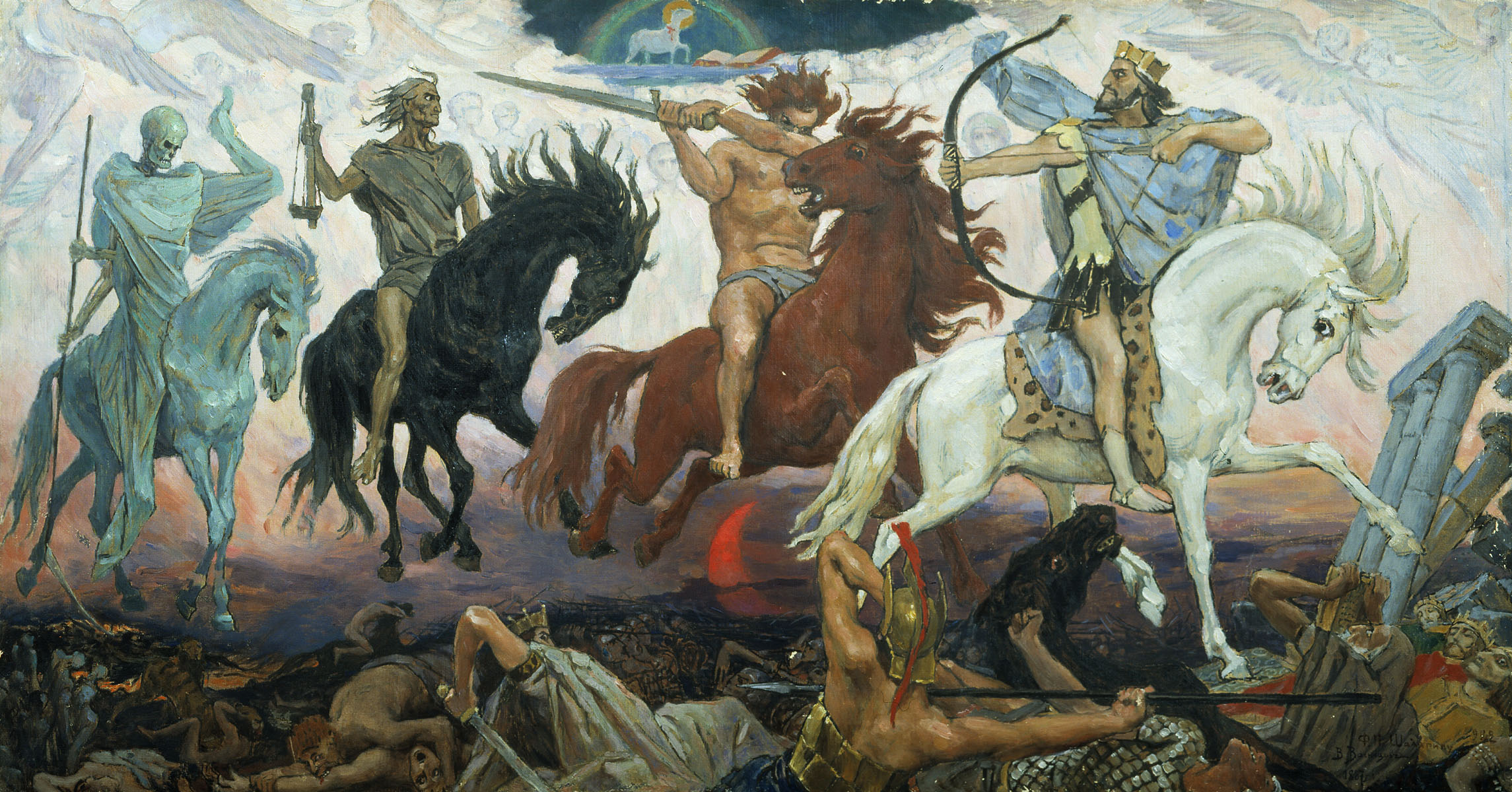
The biblical Four Horsemen of the Apocalypse. Conquest, with a bow, rides a white horse. Death rides a pale or light green horse (painting by Viktor Vasnetsov, 1887).

White is the color associated with ghosts and phantoms. In the past the dead were traditionally buried in a white shroud. Ghosts are said to be the spirits of the dead who, for various reasons, are unable to rest or enter heaven, and so walk the earth in their white shrouds. White is also connected with the paleness of death. A common expression in English is "pale as a ghost."

The White Lady, Weiße Frau, or dame blanche is a familiar figure in English, German and French ghost stories. She is a spectral apparition of a female clad in white, in most cases the ghost of an ancestor, sometimes giving warning about death and disaster. The most notable Weiße Frau is the legendary ghost of the German Hohenzollern dynasty.

Seeing a white horse in a dream is said to be presentiment of death. In the Book of Revelation, the last book in the New Testament of the Bible, the Four Horsemen of the Apocalypse are supposed to announce the Apocalypse before the Last Judgement. The man on a white horse with a bow and arrow, according to different interpretations, represents either War and Conquest, the Antichrist, or Christ himself, cleansing the world of sin. Death rides a horse whose color is described in ancient Greek as khlōros (χλωρός) in the original Koine Greek, which can mean either green/greenish-yellow or pale/pallid.

=== Opposite of black ===
In Taoism, white represents the yang or male energy, one of the two complementary natures of the universe.

Black and white often represent the contrast between light and darkness, day and night, male and female, good and evil.

In taoism, the two complementary natures of the universe, yin and yang, are often symbolized in black and white, Ancient games of strategy, such as go and chess, use black and white to represent the two sides.

In the French monarchy, white symbolized the King and his power par la grâce de Dieu ("by the grace of God") and in contrast black was the color of the queen who according to the Salic Law which excluded women from the throne (and thus from power) could never become the ruling monarch.

Black and white also often represent formality and seriousness, as in the costumes of judges and priests, business suits, of formal evening dress. Monks of the Dominican Order wear a black cloak over a white habit. Until 1972, agents of the Federal Bureau of Investigation were informally required by FBI Director J. Edgar Hoover to wear white shirts with their suits, to project the correct image of the FBI.

=== Names taken from white ===
White is the source of more names for women in western countries than any other color. Names taken from white include Alba, Albine (Latin). Blandine, Blanche and Blanchette (French); Bianca (Italian); Jennifer (Celt); Genevieve, Candice (from Latin Candida); Fenela, Fiona and Finola (Irish); Gwendoline, Gwenael, Nol(g)wen (white woman) (Celt), Nives (Spanish) and Zuria (Basque).

In addition many names come from white flowers: Camille, Daisy, Lily, Lili, Magnolie, Jasmine, Yasemine, Leila, Marguerite, Rosalba, and others.

Other names come from the white pearl; Pearl, Margarita (Latin), Margaret, Margarethe, Marga, Grete, Rita, Gitta, Marjorie, Margot.

=== Temples, churches and government buildings ===
Since ancient times, temples, churches, and many government buildings in many countries have traditionally been white, the color associated with religious and civic virtue. The Parthenon and other ancient temples of Greece, and the buildings of the Roman Forum were mostly made of or clad in white marble, though it is now known that some of these ancient buildings were actually brightly painted. The Roman tradition of using white stone for government buildings and churches was revived in the Renaissance and especially in the neoclassic style of the 18th and 19th centuries. White stone became the material of choice for government buildings in Washington, D.C., and other American cities. European cathedrals were also usually built of white or light-colored stone, though many darkened over the centuries from smoke and soot.

The Renaissance architect and scholar Leon Battista Alberti wrote in 1452 that churches should be plastered white on the inside, since white was the only appropriate color for reflection and meditation. Traditional Cistercian architecture also places a high emphasis on white for similar reasons. After the Reformation, Calvinist churches in the Netherlands were whitewashed and sober inside, a tradition that was also followed in the Protestant churches of New England, such as Old North Church in Boston.

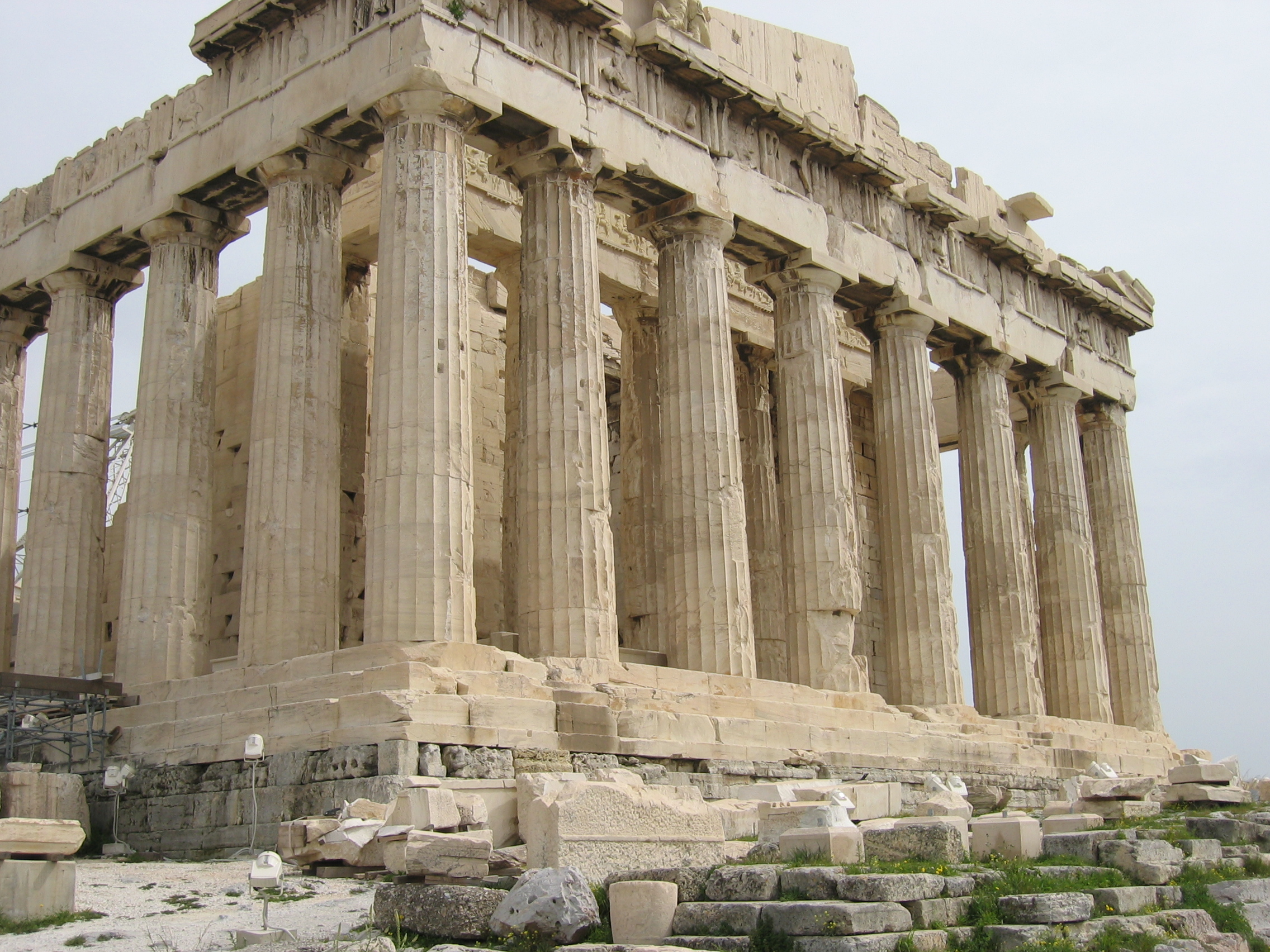
Although the Parthenon in Athens (5th century BC) is white today, it was originally painted with many colors

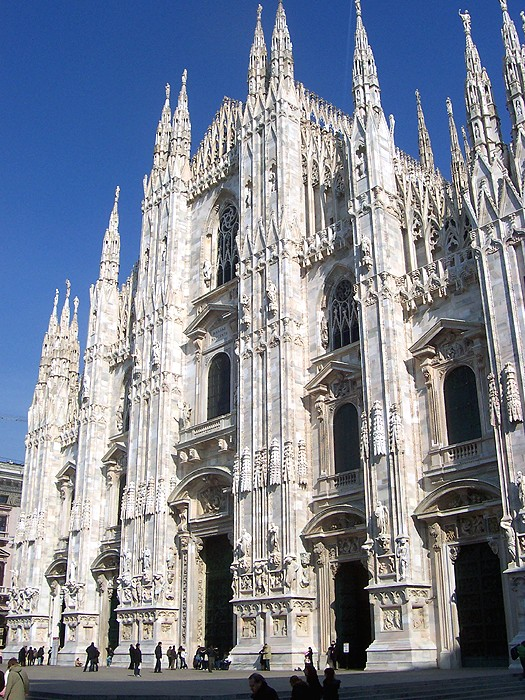
The Cathedral of Milan (1386–1965)

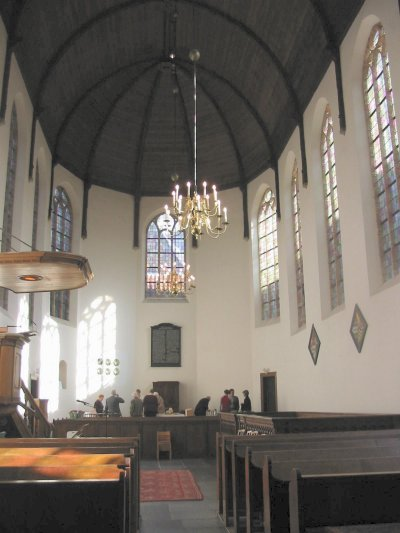
Dutch Reformed Church interior in Delft, the Netherlands (16th century)

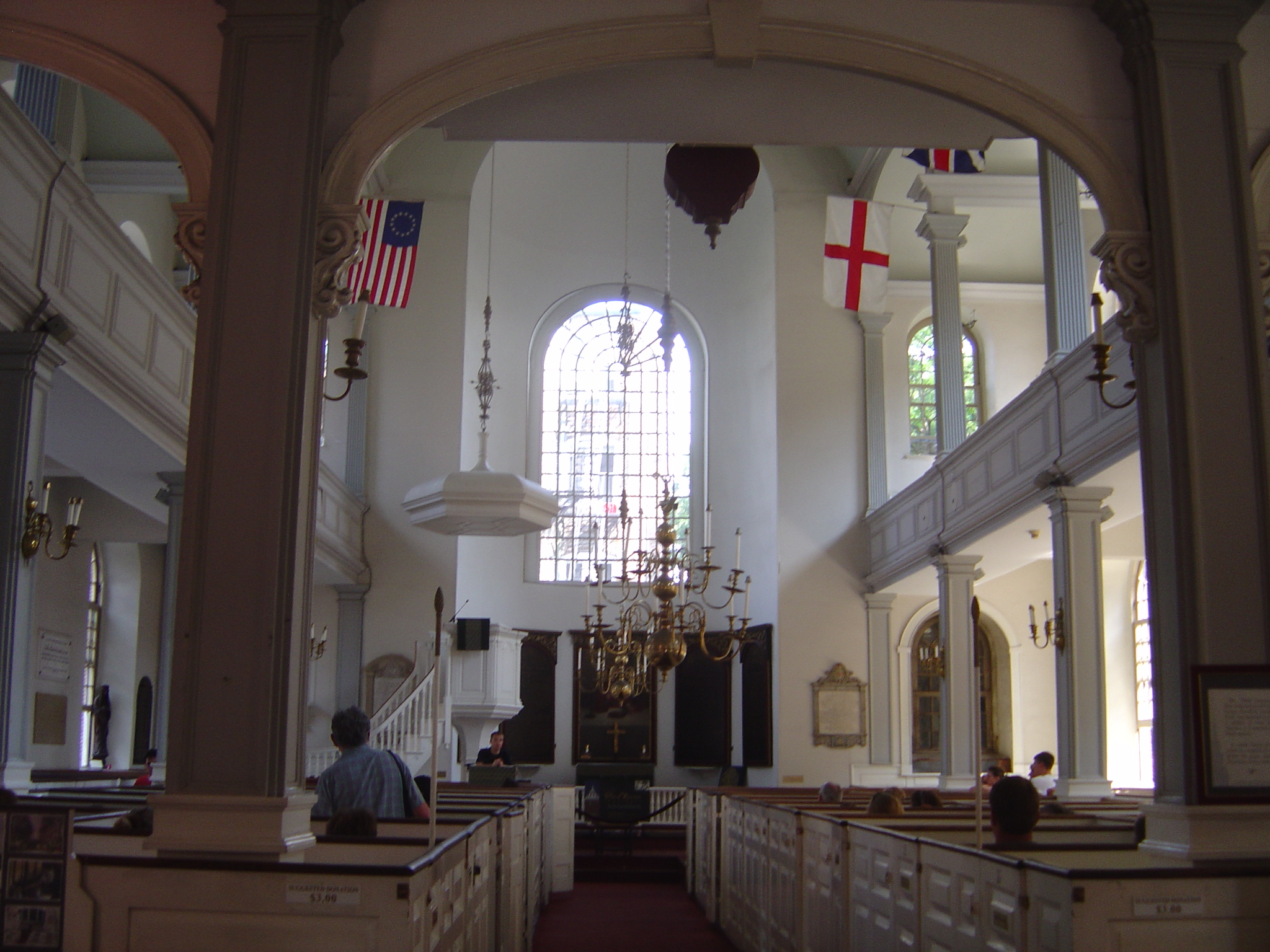
Interior of Old North Church, Boston (1723)

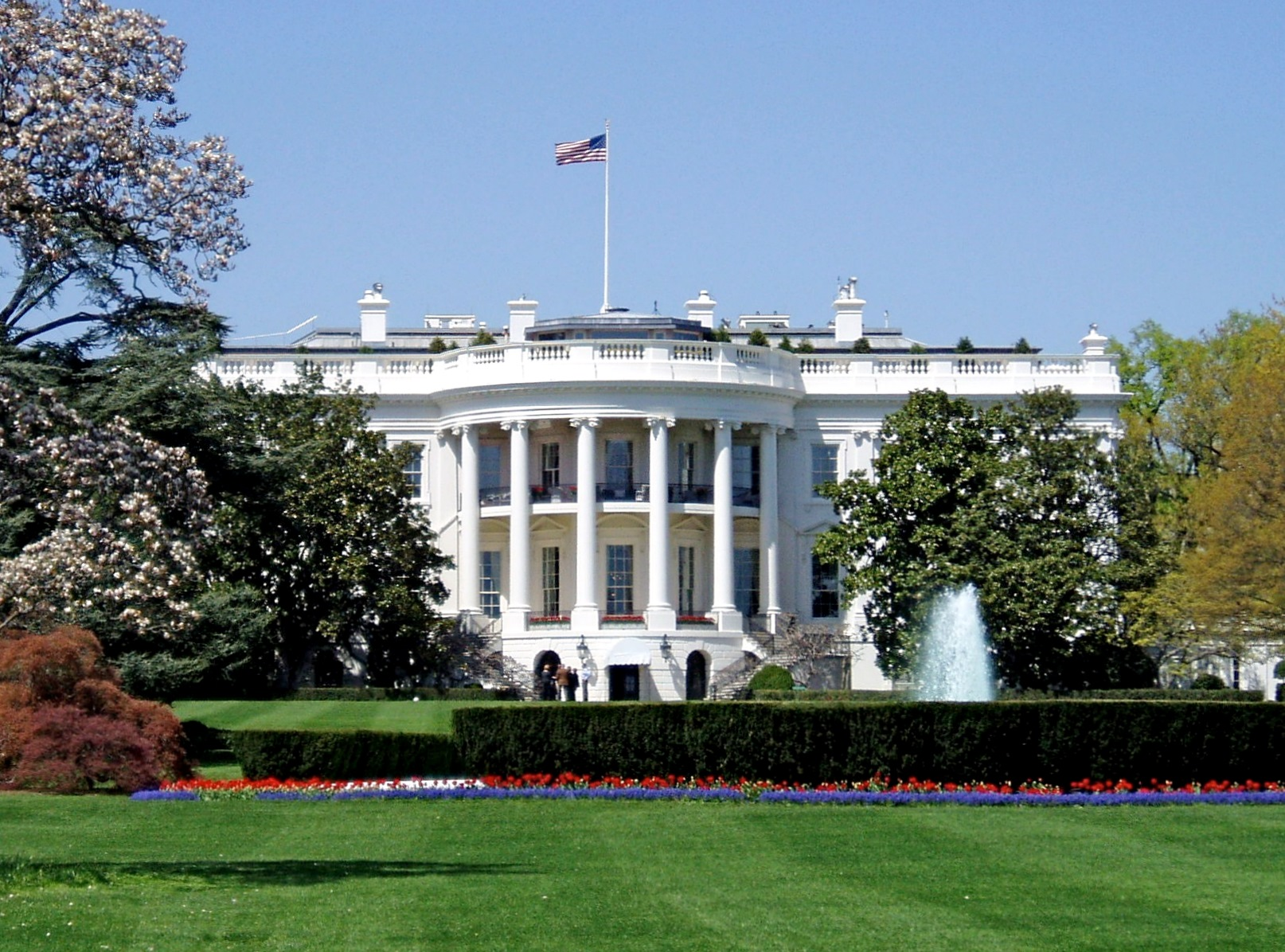
The White House (1801), Washington, D.C.

=== Ethnography ===
People of the Caucasian race are often referred to simply as white. The United States Census Bureau defines white people as those "having origins in any of the original peoples of Europe, the Middle East, or North Africa. It includes people who reported "white" or wrote in entries such as Irish, German, Italian, Lebanese, Near Easterner, Arab, or Polish." White people constitute the majority of the U.S. population, with a total of 204,277,273 or 61.6% of the population in the 2020 United States Census.

=== White flag ===
A white flag has long been used to represent either surrender or a request for a truce. It is believed to have originated in the 15th century, during the Hundred Years' War between France and England, when multicolored flags, as well as firearms, came into common use by European armies. The white flag was officially recognized as a request to cease hostilities by the Geneva Convention of 1949.

=== Vexillology and heraldry ===
In English heraldry, white or silver signified brightness, purity, virtue, and innocence.

== See also ==
- Color realism
- List of colors
- Variations of white

== Bibliography ==
- Ball, Philip (2001). Bright Earth – Art and the Invention of Colour. Penguin Group. ISBN 978-2-7541-0503-3.
- Gage, John (2009). La Couleur dans l'art. Thames & Hudson. ISBN 978-2-87811-325-9.
- Heller, Eva (2000). Psychologie de la couleur – Effets et symboliques. Pyramyd (French translation). ISBN 978-2-35017-156-2.
- Pastoureau, Michel (2005). Le petit livre des couleurs. Editions du Panama. ISBN 978-2-7578-0310-3.
- St. Clair, Kassia (2016). The Secret Lives of Colour. London: John Murray. ISBN 9781473630819. OCLC 936144129.
- Varichon, Anne (2005). Couleurs – pigments et teintures dans les mains des peuples (in French). Editions de Seuil. ISBN 978-2-02-084697-4.
- Zuffi, Stefano (2012). Color in Art. Abrams. ISBN 978-1-4197-0111-5.
