= Titanium dioxide nanoparticle =

Nanomaterial

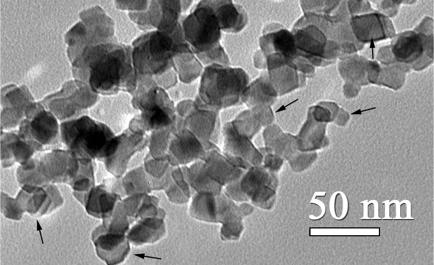
Transmission electron micrograph of titanium dioxide nanoparticles from NIST Standard Reference Material 1898

Titanium dioxide nanoparticles, also called ultrafine titanium dioxide or nanocrystalline titanium dioxide or microcrystalline titanium dioxide, are particles of titanium dioxide (TiO_{2}) with diameters less than 100 nm. Ultrafine TiO_{2} is used in sunscreens due to its ability to block ultraviolet radiation while remaining transparent on the skin. It is in rutile crystal structure and coated with silica or/and alumina to prevent photocatalytic phenomena. The health risks of ultrafine TiO_{2} from dermal exposure on intact skin are considered extremely low, and it is considered safer than other substances used for ultraviolet protection.

Nanosized particles of titanium dioxide tend to form in the metastable anatase phase, due to the lower surface energy of this phase, relative to the equilibrium rutile phase. Surfaces of ultrafine titanium dioxide in the anatase structure have photocatalytic sterilizing properties, which make it useful as an additive in construction materials, for example in antifogging coatings and self-cleaning windows.

In the context of TiO_{2} production workers, inhalation exposure potentially presents a lung cancer risk, and standard hazard controls for nanomaterials are relevant for TiO_{2} nanoparticles.

== Properties ==
Of the three common TiO_{2} polymorphs (crystal forms), TiO_{2} nanoparticles are produced in the rutile and anatase forms. Unlike larger TiO_{2} particles, TiO_{2} nanoparticles are transparent rather than white. Ultraviolet absorption characteristics are dependent on the crystal size of titanium dioxide, and ultrafine particles have strong absorption against both ultraviolet-A (320-400 nm) and ultraviolet-B (280-320 nm) radiation. Light absorption in the ultraviolet range occurs because of the presence of strongly bound excitons. The wavefunction of these excitons has a two-dimensional character and extends on the {001} plane.

TiO_{2} nanoparticles have photocatalytic activity It is n-type semiconductor and its band gap between the valence and the conductivity bands is wider than of many other substances. The photocatalysis of TiO_{2} is a complex function of the physical characteristics of the particles. Doping TiO_{2} with certain atoms its photocatalytic activity could be enhanced.

In contrast, pigment-grade TiO_{2} usually has a median particle size in the 200–300 nm range. Because TiO_{2} powders contain a range of sizes, they may have a fraction of nanoscale particles even if the average particle size is larger. In turn ultafine particles usually form agglomerates and particle size could be much larger than crystal size.

== Synthesis ==
Most manufactured nanoscale titanium dioxide is synthesized by the sulfate process, the chloride process or the sol-gel process. In the sulfate process, anatase or rutile TiO_{2} is produced by digesting ilmenite (FeTiO_{3}) or titanium slag with sulfuric acid. Ultrafine anatase form is precipitated from sulfate solution and ultrafine rutile from chloride solution.

In the chloride process, natural or synthetic rutile is chlorinated at temperatures of 850–1000 °C, and the titanium tetrachloride is converted to the ultrafine anatase form by vapor-phase oxidation.

It is not possible to convert pigmentary TiO_{2} to ultrafine TiO_{2} by grinding. Ultrafine titanium dioxide could be obtained by different kind of processes as precipitation method, gas-phase reaktion, sol-gel method, and atomic layer deposition method.

== Uses ==
Ultrafine TiO_{2} is believed to be one of the three most produced nanomaterials, along with silicon dioxide nanoparticles and zinc oxide nanoparticles. It is the second most advertised nanomaterial in consumer products, behind silver nanoparticles. Due to its long use as a commodity chemical, TiO_{2} can be considered a "legacy nanomaterial."

Ultrafine TiO_{2} is used in sunscreens due to its ability to block ultraviolet radiation while remaining transparent on the skin. TiO_{2} particles used in sunscreens typically have sizes in the range 5–50 nm.

Ultrafine TiO_{2} is used in housing and construction as an additive to paints, plastics, cements, windows, tiles, and other products for its ultraviolet absorption and photocatalytic sterilizing properties, for example, in antifogging coatings and self-cleaning windows. Engineered TiO_{2} nanoparticles are also used in light-emitting diodes and solar cells. In addition, the photocatalytic activity of TiO_{2} can be used to decompose organic compounds in wastewater. TiO_{2} nanoparticle products are sometimes coated with silica or alumina, or doped with another metal for specific applications.

== Health and safety ==
=== Consumer ===
For sunscreens, health risks from dermal exposure on intact skin are considered extremely low and are outweighed by the risk of ultraviolet radiation damage, including cancer from not wearing sunscreen. TiO_{2} nanoparticles are considered safer than other substances used for ultraviolet protection. However, there is concern that skin abrasions or rashes, or accidental ingestion of small amounts of sunscreen, are possible exposure pathways. Cosmetics containing nanomaterials are not required to be labeled in the United States, although they are in the European Union.

=== Occupational ===
Inhalation exposure is the most common route of exposure to airborne particles in the workplace. The U.S. National Institute for Occupational Safety and Health has classified inhaled ultrafine TiO_{2} as a potential occupational carcinogen due to lung cancer risk in studies on rats, with a recommended exposure limit of 0.3 mg/m^{3} as a time-weighted average for up to 10 hr/day during a 40-hour work week. This is in contrast to fine TiO_{2} (which has particle sizes below ~4 μm), which had insufficient evidence to classify as a potential occupational carcinogen, and has a higher recommended exposure limit of 2.4 mg/m^{3}. The lung tumor response observed in rats exposed to ultrafine TiO_{2} resulted from a secondary genotoxic mechanism related to the physical form of the inhaled particle, such as its surface area, rather than to the chemical compound itself, although there was insufficient evidence to corroborate this in humans. In addition, if it were combustible, when finely dispersed in the air and in contact with a sufficiently strong ignition source, TiO_{2} nanoparticles may present a dust explosion hazard.

Standard controls and procedures for the health and safety hazards of nanomaterials are relevant for TiO_{2} nanoparticles. Elimination and substitution, the most desirable approaches to hazard control, may be possible through choosing properties of the particle such as size, shape, functionalization, and agglomeration/aggregation state to improve their toxicological properties while retaining the desired functionality, or by replacing a dry powder with a slurry or suspension in a liquid solvent to reduce dust exposure. Engineering controls, mainly ventilation systems such as fume hoods and gloveboxes, are the primary class of hazard controls on a day-to-day basis. Administrative controls include training on best practices for safe handling, storage, and disposal of nanomaterials, proper labeling and warning signage, and encouraging a general safety culture. Personal protective equipment normally used for typical chemicals are also appropriate for nanomaterials, including long pants, long-sleeve shirts, closed-toed shoes, safety gloves, goggles, and impervious laboratory coats, and in some circumstances respirators may be used. Exposure assessment methods include use of both particle counters, which monitor the real-time quantity of nanomaterials and other background particles; and filter-based samples, which can be used to identify the nanomaterial, usually using electron microscopy and elemental analysis.

=== Environmental ===
Sunscreens containing TiO_{2} nanoparticles can wash off into natural water bodies or enter wastewater when people shower. Studies have indicated that TiO_{2} nanoparticles can harm algae and animals and can bioaccumulate and bioconcentrate. The U.S. Environmental Protection Agency generally does not consider physical properties such as particle size in classifying substances, and regulates TiO_{2} nanoparticles identically to other forms of TiO_{2}.

==== Toxicity ====
Titanium dioxide has been found to be toxic to plants and small organisms such as worms, nematodes, and small arthropods. The toxicity of TiO_{2} nanoparticles on nematodes increases with smaller nanoparticle diameter specifically 7 nm nanoparticles relative to 45 nm nanoparticles, but growth and reproduction are still affected regardless of the TiO_{2} nanoparticle size. The release of titanium dioxide into the soil can have a detrimental effect on the ecosystem in place due to its hindrance of proliferation and survival of soil invertebrates; it causes apoptosis as well as stunts growth, survival, and reproduction in these organisms. These invertebrates are responsible for the decomposition of organic matter and the progression of nutrient cycling in the surrounding ecosystem. Without the presence of these organisms, the soil composition would suffer.

== Metrology ==
ISO/TS 11937 is a metrology standard for measuring several characteristics of dry titanium dioxide powder relevant for nanotechnology: crystal structure and anatase–rutile ratio can be measured using X-ray diffraction, average particle and crystallite sizes using X-ray diffraction or transmission electron microscopy, and specific surface area using the Brunauer–Emmet–Teller gas adsorption method. For workplace exposure assessment, NIOSH Method 0600 for mass concentration measurements of fine particles can be used for nanoparticles using an appropriate particle size-selective sampler, and if the size distribution is known then the surface area can be inferred from the mass measurement. NIOSH Method 7300 allows TiO_{2} to be distinguished from other aerosols by elemental analysis using inductively coupled plasma atomic emission spectroscopy. Electron microscopy methods equipped with energy-dispersive X-ray spectroscopy can also identify the composition and size of particles.

NIST SRM 1898 is a reference material consisting of a dry powder of TiO_{2} nanocrystals. It is intended as a benchmark in environmental or toxicological studies, and for calibrating instruments that measure specific surface area of nanomaterials by the Brunauer–Emmet–Teller method.
