= Becher process =

The Becher process is a process to produce rutile, a form of titanium dioxide, from the ore ilmenite. Although it is competitive with the chloride process and the sulfate process, the Becher process is not used on scale.

With the idealized formula FeTiO_{3}, ilmenite contains 55-65% titanium dioxide, the rest being iron oxide. The Becher process, like other beneficiation processes, aims to remove iron. The Becher process exploits the conversion of the ferrous iron (FeO) to ferric iron (Fe_{2}O_{3}). Ilmenite ores can be upgraded to synthetic rutile by increasing their TiO_{2} content to between 90 and 96 percent.

== History ==
This technology was developed in the early 1960s in Western Australia by a joint initiative between industry and government. The process was named after Robert Gordon Becher, who while working at the Western Australian Government Chemical Laboratories (the precursor to ChemCentre) invented, developed and introduced the technique to the Western Australian Mineral Sands industry. The process was patented in 1961.

== Process ==
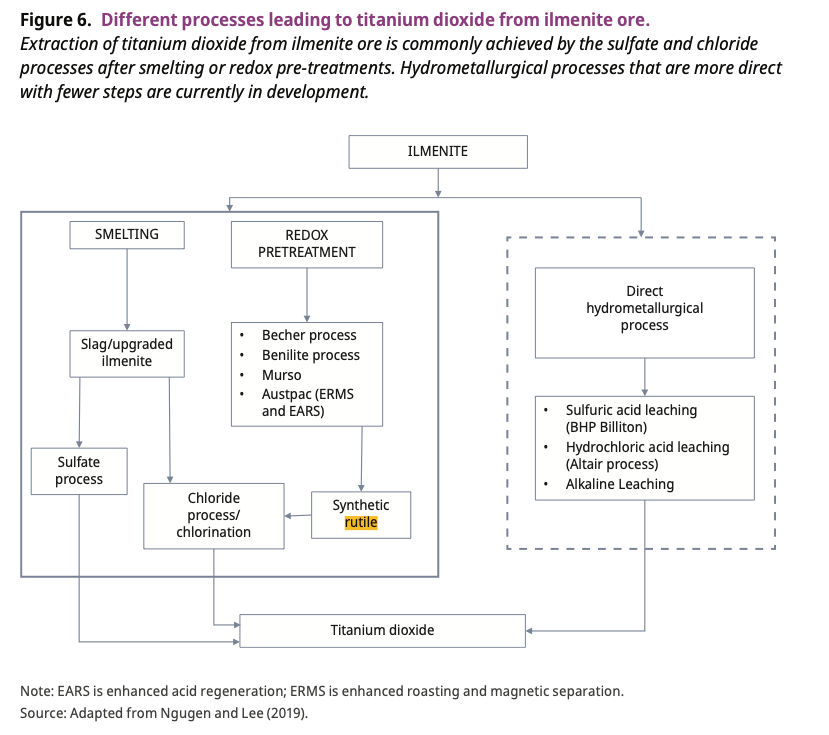
Different processes leading to titanium dioxide from ilmenite ore

The Becher process is suitable for weathered ilmenite that has low concentrations of chromium and magnesium. There are four steps involved in removing the iron portion of the ilmenite:

1. Oxidation
2. Reduction
3. Aeration
4. Leaching

=== Oxidation ===
Oxidation involves heating the ilmenite in a rotary kiln with air to convert iron to iron(III) oxide:

4 FeTiO_{3} + O_{2} → 2 Fe_{2}O_{3}·TiO_{2} + 2 TiO_{2}

This step is suitable for a range of ilmenite-containing feedstocks.

=== Reduction ===
Reduction is performed in a rotary kiln with pseudobrookite (Fe_{2}O_{3}.TiO_{2}), coal, and sulfur, then heated to a temperature greater than 1200 °C. The iron oxide in the mineral grains is reduced to metallic iron to produce reduced ilmenite:

Fe_{2}O_{3}·TiO_{2} + 3 CO → 2 Fe + TiO_{2} + 3 CO_{2}

The "reduced ilmenite" is separated from the char prior to the next step.

=== Aeration ===
Aeration involves the removal of the metallic iron created in the last step by "rusting" it out. This conversion is achieved in large tanks that contain 1% ammonium chloride solution with air being pumped through the tank. The tank is being continuously agitated, and the iron will rust and precipitate in the form of a slime.

4 Fe + 3 O_{2} → 2 Fe_{2}O_{3}

The finer iron oxide is then separated from the larger particles of synthetic rutile.

=== Acid leach ===
Once the majority of the iron oxide has been removed the remainder of it is leached away using 0.5M sulfuric acid.
