= Carbothermic reaction =

Reduction of substances using carbon

Carbothermal reduction of molten potassium nitrate with charcoal to potassium nitrite

Carbothermic reactions are chemical reactions involving reduction of substances, often metal oxides (O^{2-}), using carbon (C) as the reducing agent. Depending on the starting material, the process is usually carried out in an electric arc furnace or reverberatory furnace at temperatures of several hundred degrees Celsius. Carbothermal reactions produce carbon monoxide (CO) and sometimes carbon dioxide (CO_{2}). The facility of these conversions is attributable to the entropy of reaction: two solid compounds—the (metal) oxide (and flux) and carbon—are converted to a new solid (metal) compound and a gas (CO_{x}), the latter having high entropy.

Carbothermic reactions are used in the production of the elemental forms of many elements. The ability of metals to participate in carbothermic reactions can be predicted from Ellingham diagrams.

== Applications ==
A prominent and probably the best-known example is that of iron ore smelting. Many reactions are involved, but the simplified equation is usually shown as:

2 Fe_{2}O_{3} + 3 C → 4 Fe + 3 CO_{2}

On a more modest scale, about 1 million tons of elemental phosphorus is produced annually by carbothermic reactions. Calcium phosphate (phosphate rock) is heated to 1,200–1,500 °C with sand, which is mostly SiO_{2}, and coke (impure carbon) to produce P_{4}. The chemical equation for this process when starting with fluoroapatite, a common phosphate mineral, is:

4 Ca_{5}(PO_{4})_{3}F + 18 SiO_{2} + 30 C → 3 P_{4} + 30 CO + 18 CaSiO_{3} + 2 CaF_{2}

Of historic interest is the Leblanc process. A key step in this process is the reduction of sodium sulfate with coal:

Na_{2}SO_{4} + 2 C → Na_{2}S + 2 CO_{2}

The Na_{2}S is then treated with calcium carbonate to give sodium carbonate, a commodity chemical.

Recently, development of the 'MagSonic' carbothermic magnesium process has restarted interest in its chemistry:

MgO + C ↔ Mg + CO

The reaction is readily reversible from its product vapors, and requires rapid cooling to prevent back-reaction.

=== Silicon ===
Metallurgical grade silicon may also be obtained by carbothermic reaction. The overall reaction is following:

SiO_{2} + C ↔ Si + CO_{2}

The actual reaction given is more complex than it seems and includes several steps.

=== Variations ===
Sometimes carbothermic reactions are coupled to other conversions. One example is the chloride process for separating titanium from ilmenite, the main ore of titanium. In this process, a mixture of carbon and the crushed ore is heated at 1000 °C under flowing chlorine gas, giving titanium tetrachloride:

2 FeTiO_{3} + 7 Cl_{2} + 6 C → 2 TiCl_{4} + 2 FeCl_{3} + 6 CO

For some metals, carbothermic reactions do not afford the metal, but instead give the metal carbide. This behavior is observed for titanium, hence the use of the chloride process. Carbides also form upon high temperature treatment of Cr_{2}O_{3} with carbon. For this reason, aluminium is employed as the reducing agent.
