= Titanium dioxide =

Chemical compound

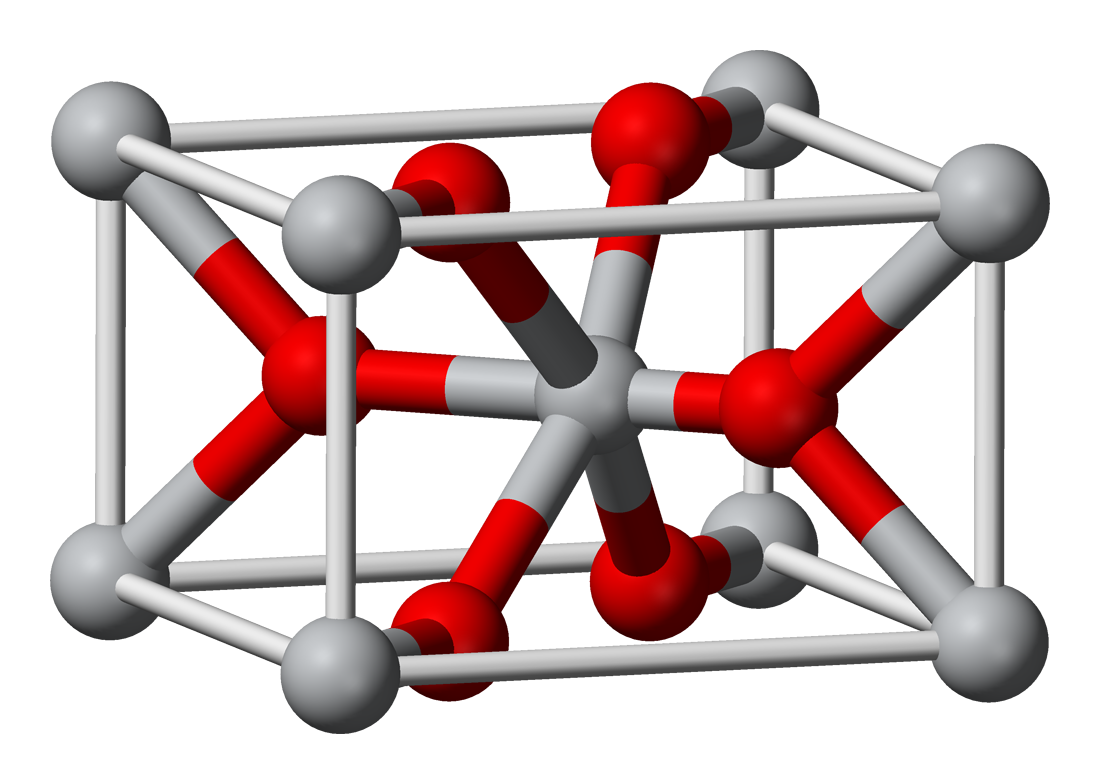
- Titanium(IV) oxide Unit cell of titanium dioxide (rutile form); Titanium Oxygen

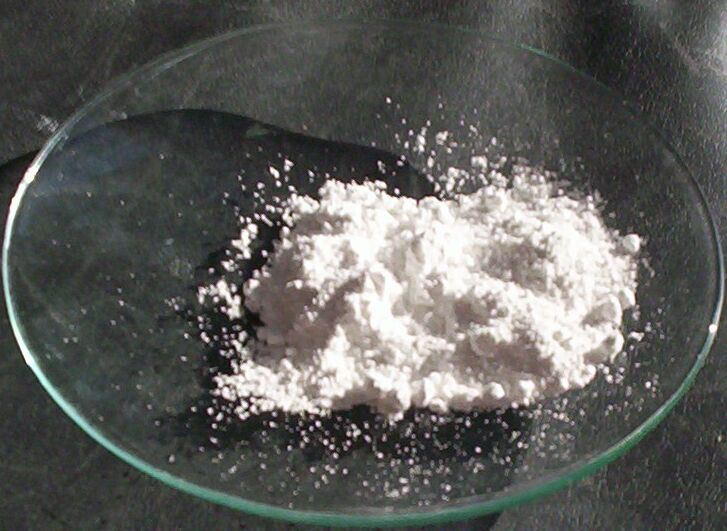
- The unit cell of rutile

Names
- IUPAC names Titanium dioxide Titanium(IV) oxide
- Other names: Titania; Rutile; Anatase; Brookite

Identifiers
CAS Number	13463-67-7
3D model (JSmol)	Interactive image
ChEBI	CHEBI:32234
ChEMBL	ChEMBL1201136
ChemSpider	24256
ECHA InfoCard	100.033.327
E number	E171 (colours)
KEGG	C13409
PubChem CID	26042
RTECS number	XR2775000
UNII	15FIX9V2JP
CompTox Dashboard (EPA)	DTXSID3021352
- InChI: InChI=1S/2O.Ti Key: GWEVSGVZZGPLCZ-UHFFFAOYSA-N; InChI=1/2O.Ti/rO2Ti/c1-3-2 Key: GWEVSGVZZGPLCZ-TYTSCOISAW
- SMILES: O=[Ti]=O

Properties
Chemical formula	TiO_{2}
Molar mass	79.866 g/mol
Appearance	White solid
Odor	Odorless
Density	4.23 g/cm^{3} (rutile); 3.78 g/cm^{3} (anatase)
Melting point	1,843 °C (3,349 °F; 2,116 K)
Boiling point	2,972 °C (5,382 °F; 3,245 K)
Solubility in water	Insoluble
Magnetic susceptibility (χ)	+5.9·10^{−6} cm^{3}/mol
Refractive index (n_{D})	2.488 (anatase); 2.583 (brookite); 2.609 (rutile)

Thermochemistry
Std molar entropy (S^{⦵}_{298})	50 J·mol^{−1}·K^{−1}
Std enthalpy of formation (Δ_{f}H^{⦵}_{298})	−945 kJ·mol^{−1}

Hazards
- GHS labelling
Pictograms	(GHS06: Toxic) (GHS08: Health hazard) (GHS09: Environmental hazard)
NFPA 704 (fire diamond)	1 0 0
Flash point	not flammable
- NIOSH (US health exposure limits)
PEL (Permissible)	TWA 15 mg/m^{3}
REL (Recommended)	Ca
IDLH (Immediate danger)	Ca [5000 mg/m^{3}]
Safety data sheet (SDS)	ICSC 0338

Related compounds
Other cations	Zirconium dioxide Hafnium dioxide
Related Titanium oxides	Titanium(II) oxide Titanium(III) oxide Titanium(III,IV) oxide
Related compounds	Titanic acid
- Except where otherwise noted, data are given for materials in their standard state (at 25 °C [77 °F], 100 kPa). verify (what is ?) Infobox references

Titanium dioxide, also known as titanium(IV) oxide or titania /taɪˈteɪniə/, is the inorganic compound derived from titanium with the chemical formula TiO_{2}. When used as a pigment, it is called titanium white, Pigment White 6 (PW6), or CI 77891. It is a white solid that is insoluble in water, although mineral forms can appear black. As a pigment, it has a wide range of applications, including paint, sunscreen, and food coloring. When used as a food coloring, it has E number E171. World production in 2014 exceeded 9 million tonnes. It has been estimated that titanium dioxide is used in two-thirds of all pigments, and pigments based on the oxide have been valued at a price of $13.2 billion.

== Structure ==
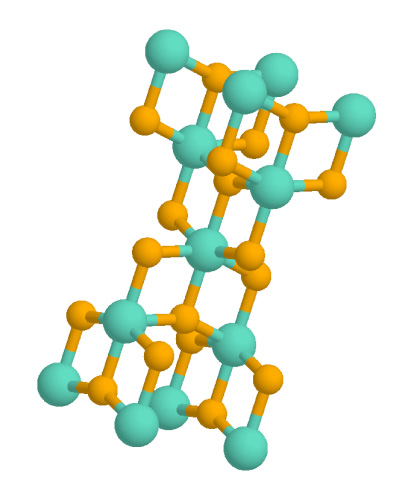
Structure of anatase. Together with rutile and brookite, one of the three major polymorphs of TiO_{2}.

In all three of its main dioxides, titanium exhibits octahedral geometry, being bonded to six oxide anions. The oxides in turn are bonded to three Ti centers. The overall crystal structures of rutile and anatase are tetragonal in symmetry whereas brookite is orthorhombic. The oxygen substructures are all slight distortions of close packing: in rutile, the oxide anions are arranged in distorted hexagonal close-packing, whereas they are close to cubic close-packing in anatase and to "double hexagonal close-packing" for brookite. The rutile structure is widespread for other metal dioxides and difluorides, e.g. RuO_{2} and ZnF_{2}.

Molten titanium dioxide has a local structure in which each Ti is coordinated to, on average, about 5 oxygen atoms. This is distinct from the crystalline forms in which Ti coordinates to 6 oxygen atoms.

== Synthetic and geologic occurrence ==
Synthetic TiO_{2} is mainly produced from the mineral ilmenite. Rutile, and anatase, naturally occurring TiO_{2}, occur widely also, e.g. rutile as a 'heavy mineral' in beach sand. Leucoxene, fine-grained anatase formed by natural alteration of ilmenite, is yet another ore. Star sapphires and rubies get their asterism from oriented inclusions of rutile needles.

=== Mineralogy and uncommon polymorphs ===
Titanium dioxide occurs in nature as the minerals rutile and anatase. Additionally two high-pressure forms are known minerals: a monoclinic baddeleyite-like form known as akaogiite, and the other has a slight monoclinic distortion of the orthorhombic α-PbO_{2} structure and is known as riesite, both of which can be found at the Ries crater in Bavaria. It is mainly sourced from ilmenite, which is the most widespread titanium dioxide-bearing ore around the world. Rutile is the next most abundant and contains around 98% titanium dioxide in the ore. The metastable anatase and brookite phases convert irreversibly to the equilibrium rutile phase upon heating above temperatures in the range 600–800 °C (1,110–1,470 °F).

Titanium dioxide has twelve known polymorphs – in addition to rutile, anatase, brookite, akaogiite and riesite, three metastable phases can be produced synthetically (monoclinic, tetragonal, and orthorhombic ramsdellite-like), and four high-pressure forms (α-PbO_{2}-like, cotunnite-like, orthorhombic OI, and cubic phases) also exist:

Form	Crystal system	Synthesis
Rutile	Tetragonal	
Anatase	Tetragonal	
Brookite	Orthorhombic	
TiO_{2}(B)	Monoclinic	Hydrolysis of K_{2}Ti_{4}O_{9} followed by heating
TiO_{2}(H), hollandite-like form	Tetragonal	Oxidation of the related potassium titanate bronze, K_{0.25}TiO_{2}
TiO_{2}(R), ramsdellite-like form	Orthorhombic	Oxidation of the related lithium titanate bronze Li_{0.5}TiO_{2}
TiO_{2}(II)-(α-PbO_{2}-like form)	Orthorhombic	
Akaogiite (baddeleyite-like form, 7 coordinated Ti)	Monoclinic	
TiO_{2} -OI	Orthorhombic	
Cubic form	Cubic	P > 40 GPa, T > 1600 °C
TiO_{2} -OII, cotunnite(PbCl_{2})-like	Orthorhombic	P > 40 GPa, T > 700 °C

The cotunnite-type phase was claimed to be the hardest known oxide with the Vickers hardness of 38 GPa and the bulk modulus of 431 GPa (i.e. close to diamond's value of 446 GPa) at atmospheric pressure. However, later studies came to different conclusions with much lower values for both the hardness (7–20 GPa, which makes it softer than common oxides like corundum Al_{2}O_{3} and rutile TiO_{2}) and bulk modulus (~300 GPa).

Titanium dioxide (B) is found as a mineral in magmatic rocks and hydrothermal veins, as well as weathering rims on perovskite. TiO_{2} also forms lamellae in other minerals.

== Production ==
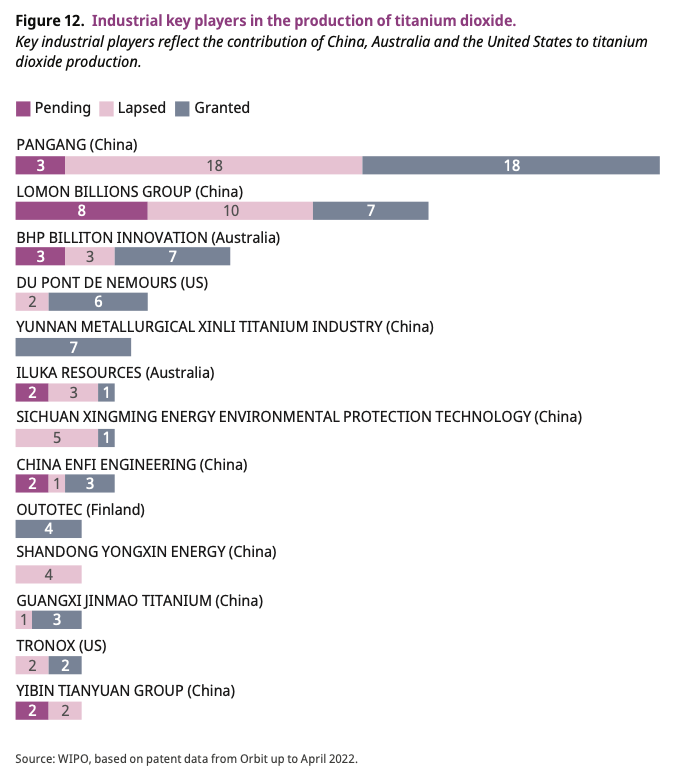
Industrial key players in the production of titanium dioxide - 2022

Evolution of the global production of titanium dioxide according to process

The largest TiO_{2} pigment processors are Chemours, Venator, Kronos, and Tronox. Major paint and coating company end users for pigment grade titanium dioxide include Akzo Nobel, PPG Industries, Sherwin Williams, BASF, and Kansai Paints. World TiO_{2} pigment capacity was estimated at 9.9 million tonnes per year in 2025, of which China accounted for 6.0 million tonnes.

The production method depends on the feedstock. In addition to ores, other feedstocks include upgraded slag. Both the chloride process and the sulfate process (both described below) produce titanium dioxide pigment in the rutile crystal form, but the sulfate process can be adjusted to produce the anatase form. Anatase, being softer, is used in fiber and paper applications. The sulfate process is run as a batch process; the chloride process is run as a continuous process.

=== Chloride process ===
In chloride process, the ore is treated with chlorine and carbon to give titanium tetrachloride, a volatile liquid that is further purified by distillation. The TiCl_{4} is treated with oxygen to regenerate chlorine and produce the titanium dioxide.

=== Sulfate process ===
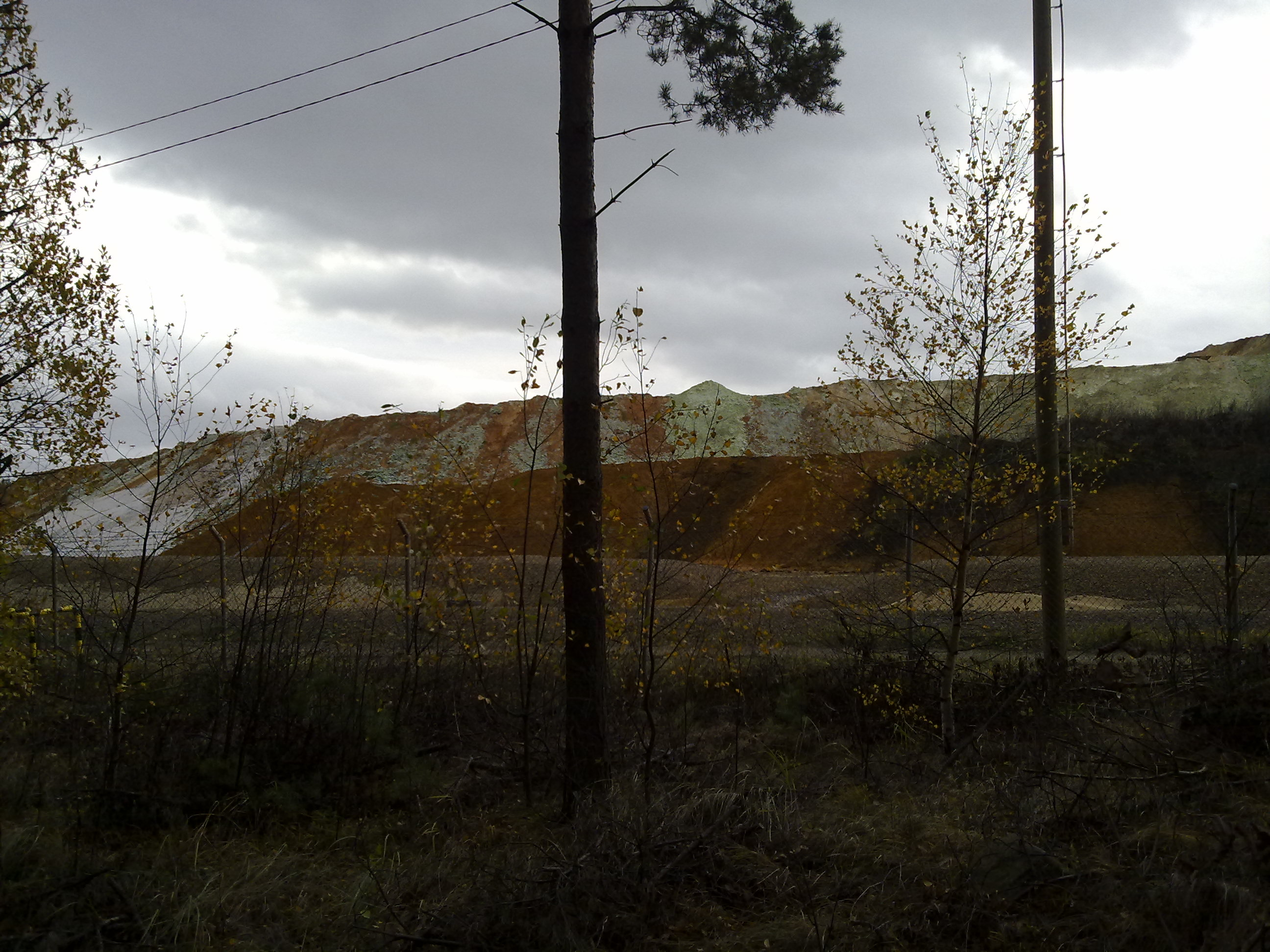
Residues from sulfate process outside a titanium dioxide production facility in Kaanaa, Pori, Finland.

In the sulfate process, ilmenite is treated with sulfuric acid to extract iron(II) sulfate pentahydrate. This process requires concentrated ilmenite (45–60% TiO_{2}) or pretreated feedstocks as a suitable source of titanium. The resulting synthetic rutile is further processed according to the specifications of the end user, i.e. pigment grade or otherwise.

Examples of plants using the sulfate process are the Sorel-Tracy plant of QIT-Fer et Titane and the Eramet Titanium & Iron smelter in Tyssedal Norway.

=== Becher process ===
The Becher process is another method for the production of synthetic rutile from ilmenite. It first oxidizes the ilmenite as a means to separate the iron component.

=== Specialized methods ===
For specialty applications, TiO_{2} films are prepared by various specialized chemistries. Sol-gel routes involve the hydrolysis of titanium alkoxides such as titanium ethoxide:

Ti(OEt)_{4} + 2 H_{2}O → TiO_{2} + 4 EtOH

A related approach that also relies on molecular precursors involves chemical vapor deposition. In this method, the alkoxide is volatilized and then decomposed on contact with a hot surface:

Ti(OEt)_{4} → TiO_{2} + 2 Et_{2}O

== Applications ==
=== Pigment ===
First mass-produced in 1916, titanium dioxide is the most widely used white pigment because of its brightness and very high refractive index, in which it is surpassed only by a few other materials (see list of indices of refraction). Titanium dioxide crystal size is ideally around 220 nm (measured by electron microscope) to optimize the maximum reflection of visible light. Approximately 4.6 million tons of pigmentary TiO_{2} are used annually worldwide, and this number is expected to increase as use continues to rise.

TiO_{2} is also an effective opacifier in powder form, where it is employed as a pigment to provide whiteness and opacity to products such as paints, coatings, plastics, papers, inks, toners, foods, supplements, medicines (i.e. pills and tablets), and most toothpastes; in 2019, it was present in two-thirds of toothpastes on the French market. In paint, it may be called "brilliant white", "the perfect white", "the whitest white", or other similar terms. Opacity is improved by optimal sizing of the titanium dioxide particles.

=== Food additive ===
Often used as color in food, it is commonly found in ice creams, chocolates, all types of candy, creamers, desserts, marshmallows, chewing gum, pastries, spreads, dressings, cakes, some cheeses, and many other foods. It is permitted in many countries, but was banned for use in food by the European Union in 2022.

=== Thin films ===
When deposited as a thin film, its refractive index and colour make it an excellent reflective optical coating for dielectric mirrors; it is also used in generating decorative thin films such as found in "mystic fire topaz".

Some grades of modified titanium based pigments as used in sparkly paints, plastics, finishes and cosmetics – these are man-made pigments whose particles have two or more layers of various oxides – often titanium dioxide, iron oxide or alumina – in order to have glittering, iridescent and or pearlescent effects similar to crushed mica or guanine-based products. In addition to these effects a limited colour change is possible in certain formulations depending on how and at which angle the finished product is illuminated and the thickness of the oxide layer in the pigment particle; one or more colours appear by reflection while the other tones appear due to interference of the transparent titanium dioxide layers. In some products, the layer of titanium dioxide is grown in conjunction with iron oxide by calcination of titanium salts (sulfates, chlorates) around 800 °C One example of a pearlescent pigment is Iriodin, based on mica coated with titanium dioxide or iron (III) oxide.

The iridescent effect in these titanium oxide particles is unlike the opaque effect obtained with usual ground titanium oxide pigment obtained by mining, in which case only a certain diameter of the particle is considered and the effect is due only to scattering.

=== Sunscreen and UV blocking pigments ===
In cosmetic and skin care products, titanium dioxide is used as a pigment, sunscreen and a thickener. As a sunscreen, ultrafine TiO_{2} is used in combination with ultrafine zinc oxide, to lower the incidence of sun burns and minimize the premature photoaging, photocarcinogenesis and immunosuppression associated with long term excess sun exposure. Sometimes these UV blockers are combined with iron oxide pigments in sunscreen to increase visible light protection.

TiO_{2} is used extensively in plastics and other applications as a white pigment or an opacifier and for its UV resistant properties where the powder disperses light – unlike organic UV absorbers – and reduces UV damage, due mostly to the particle's high refractive index.

=== Other uses of titanium dioxide ===
In ceramic glazes, titanium dioxide acts as an opacifier and seeds crystal formation.

It is used as a tattoo pigment and in styptic pencils. Titanium dioxide is produced in varying particle sizes which are both oil and water dispersible, and in certain grades for the cosmetic industry. It is also a common ingredient in toothpaste.

The exterior of the Saturn V rocket was painted with titanium dioxide; this later allowed astronomers to determine that J002E3 was likely the S-IVB stage from Apollo 12 and not an asteroid.

Titanium dioxide is an n-type semiconductor and is used in dye-sensitized solar cells. It is also used in other electronics components such as electrodes in batteries.

== Research ==
=== Patenting activities ===
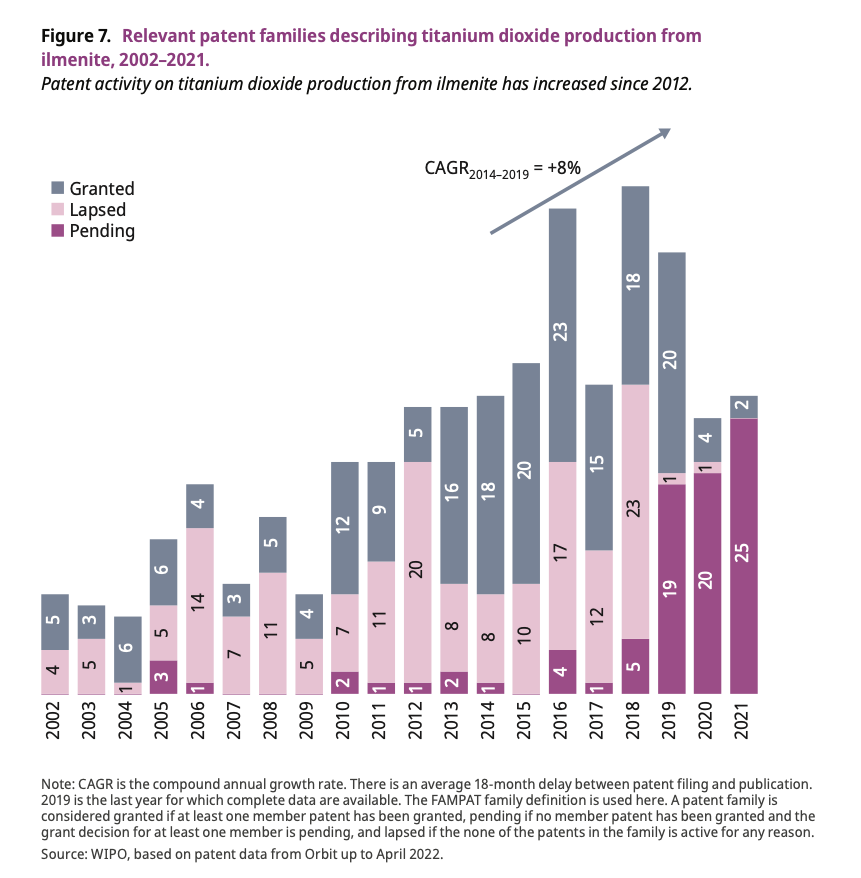
Relevant patent families describing titanium dioxide production from ilmenite, 2002–2021.

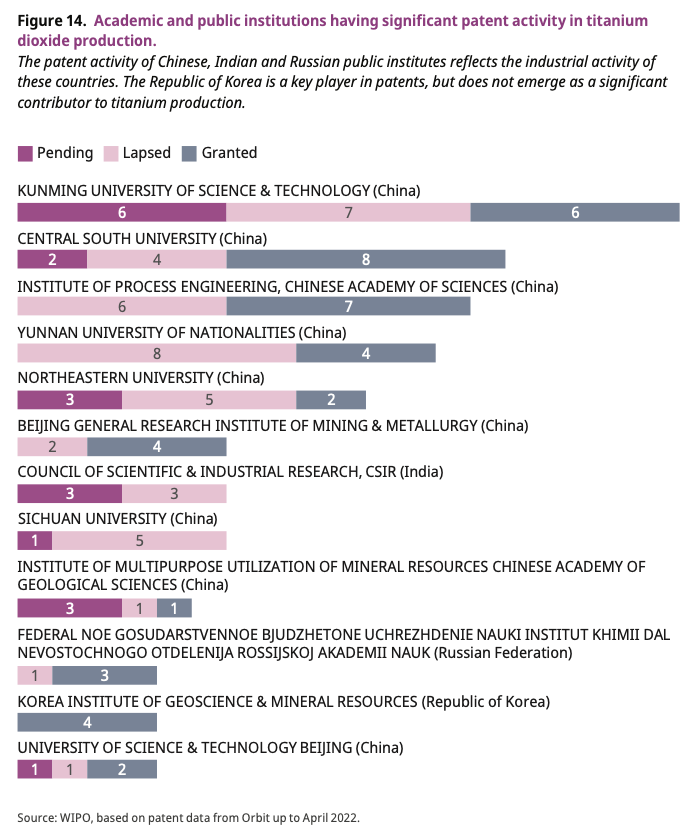
Academic and public institutions having significant patent activity in titanium dioxide production, 2022.

Between 2002 and 2022, there were 459 patent families that describe the production of titanium dioxide from ilmenite. The majority of these patents describe pre-treatment processes, such as using smelting and magnetic separation to increase titanium concentration in low-grade ores, leading to titanium concentrates or slags. Other patents describe processes to obtain titanium dioxide, either by a direct hydrometallurgical process or through the main industrial production processes, the sulfate process and the chloride process. The sulfate process represents 40% of the world's titanium dioxide production and is protected in 23% of patent families. The chloride process is only mentioned in 8% of patent families, although it provides 60% of the worldwide industrial production of titanium dioxide.

Key contributors to patents on the production of titanium dioxide are companies from China, Australia and the United States, reflecting the major contribution of these countries to industrial production. Chinese companies Pangang and Lomon Billions Groups hold major patent portfolios.

=== Photocatalyst ===
Nanosized titanium dioxide, particularly in the anatase form, exhibits photocatalytic activity under ultraviolet (UV) irradiation. This photoactivity is reportedly most pronounced at the {001} planes of anatase, although the {101} planes are thermodynamically more stable and thus more prominent in most synthesised and natural anatase, as evident by the often observed tetragonal dipyramidal growth habit. Interfaces between rutile and anatase are further considered to improve photocatalytic activity by facilitating charge carrier separation and as a result, biphasic titanium dioxide is often considered to possess enhanced functionality as a photocatalyst. It has been reported that titanium dioxide, when doped with nitrogen ions or doped with metal oxide like tungsten trioxide, exhibits excitation also under visible light. The strong oxidative potential of the positive holes oxidizes water to create hydroxyl radicals. It can also oxidize oxygen or organic materials directly. Hence, in addition to its use as a pigment, titanium dioxide can be added to paints, cements, windows, tiles, or other products for its sterilizing, deodorizing, and anti-fouling properties, and is used as a hydrolysis catalyst. It is also used in dye-sensitized solar cells, which are a type of chemical solar cell (also known as a Graetzel cell).

The photocatalytic properties of nanosized titanium dioxide were discovered by Akira Fujishima in 1967 and published in 1972. The process on the surface of the titanium dioxide was called the Honda-Fujishima effect. In thin film and nanoparticle form, titanium dioxide has the potential for use in energy production: As a photocatalyst, it can break water into hydrogen and oxygen. With the hydrogen collected, it could be used as a fuel. The efficiency of this process can be greatly improved by doping the oxide with carbon. Further efficiency and durability has been obtained by introducing disorder to the lattice structure of the surface layer of titanium dioxide nanocrystals, permitting infrared absorption. Visible-light-active nanosized anatase and rutile has been developed for photocatalytic applications.

In 1995 Fujishima and his group discovered the superhydrophilicity phenomenon for titanium dioxide coated glass exposed to sun light. This resulted in the development of self-cleaning glass and anti-fogging coatings.

Nanosized TiO_{2} incorporated into outdoor building materials, such as paving stones in noxer blocks or paints, could reduce concentrations of airborne pollutants such as volatile organic compounds and nitrogen oxides. A TiO_{2}-containing cement has been produced.

Using TiO_{2} as a photocatalyst, attempts have been made to mineralize pollutants (to convert into CO_{2} and H_{2}O) in waste water. The photocatalytic destruction of organic matter could also be exploited in coatings with antimicrobial applications.

==== Hydroxyl radical formation ====
Although nanosized anatase TiO_{2} does not absorb visible light, it does strongly absorb ultraviolet (UV) radiation (hv), leading to the formation of hydroxyl radicals. This occurs when photo-induced valence bond holes (h^{+}_{vb}) are trapped at the surface of TiO_{2} leading to the formation of trapped holes (h^{+}_{tr}) that cannot oxidize water.

TiO_{2} + hv → e^{−} + h^{+}_{vb}
h^{+}_{vb} → h^{+}_{tr}
O_{2} + e^{−} → O_{2}^{•−}
O_{2}^{•−} + O_{2}^{•−}+ 2 H^{+} → H_{2}O_{2} + O_{2}
O_{2}^{•−} + h^{+}_{vb} → O_{2}
O_{2}^{•−} + h^{+}_{tr} → O_{2}
OH^{−} + h^{+}_{vb} → HO•
e^{−} + h^{+}_{tr} → recombination
Note: Wavelength (λ)= 387 nm This reaction has been found to mineralize and decompose undesirable compounds in the environment, specifically the air and in wastewater.

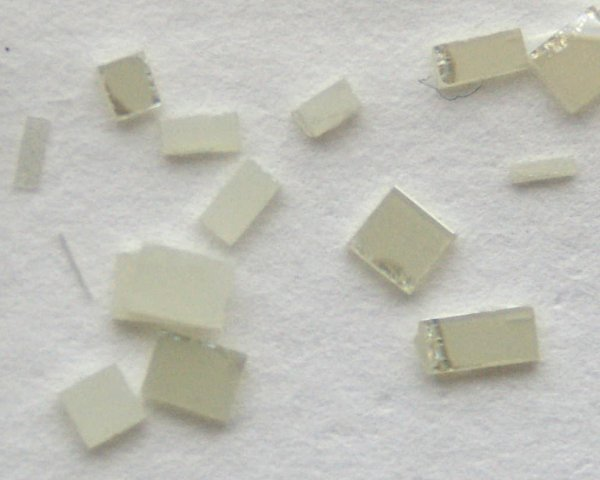
Synthetic single crystals of TiO_{2}, c. 2–3 mm in size, cut from a larger plate

=== Nanotubes ===
Anatase can be converted into non-carbon nanotubes and nanowires. Hollow TiO_{2} nanofibers can also be prepared by coating carbon nanofibers by first applying titanium butoxide.

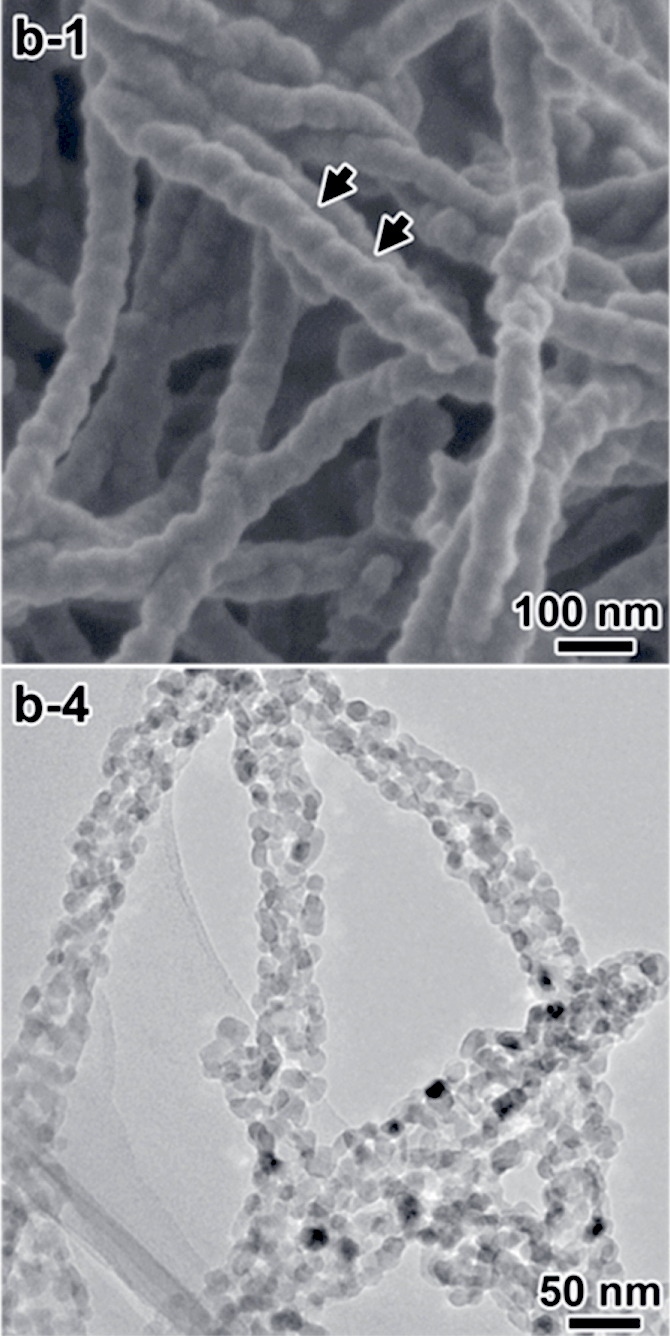
SEM (top) and TEM (bottom) images of chiral TiO_{2} nanofibers

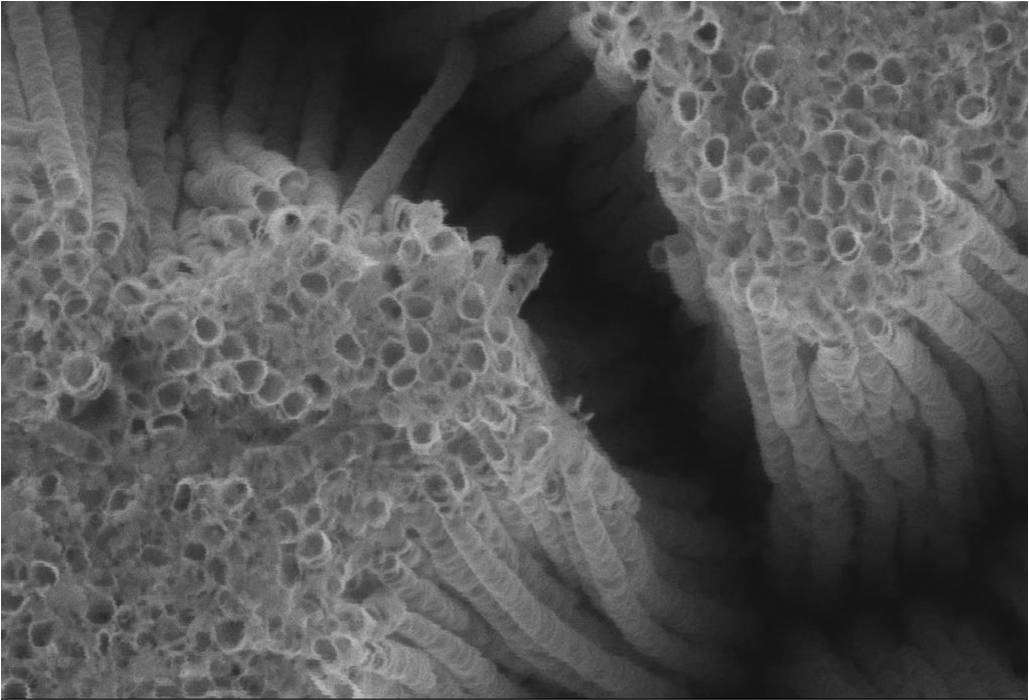
Titanium oxide nanotubes, SEM image

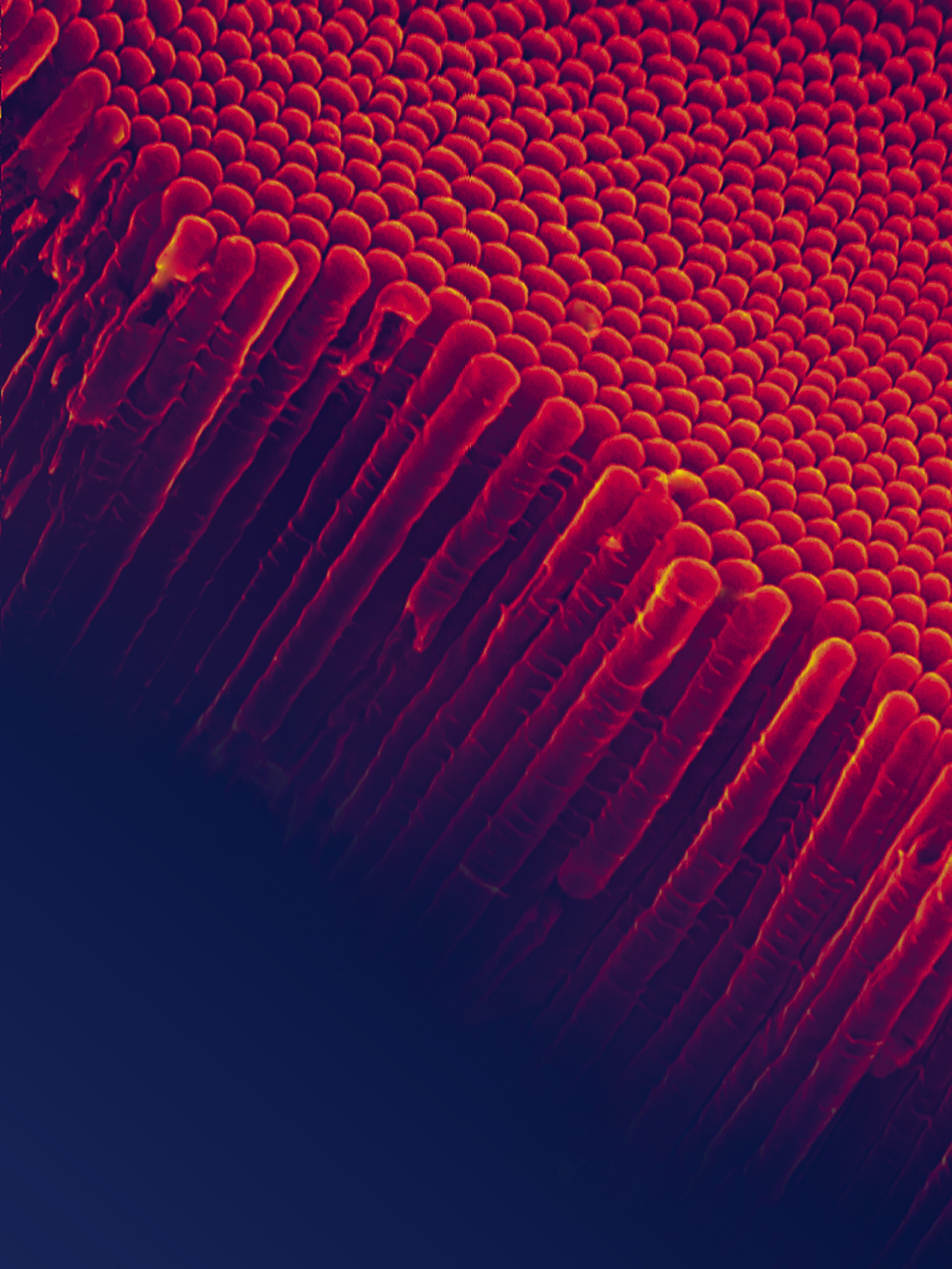
Nanotubes of titanium dioxide (TiO_{2}-Nt) obtained by electrochemical synthesis. The SEM image shows an array of vertical self-ordered TiO_{2}-Nt with closed bottom ends of tubes.

=== Solubility ===
Titanium dioxide is insoluble in water, organic solvents, and inorganic acids. It is slightly soluble in alkali, soluble in saturated potassium bicarbonate, and can be completely dissolved in strong sulfuric acid and hydrofluoric acid after boiling for a long time.

== Health and safety ==
=== Inhalation ===
Titanium dioxide dust, when inhaled, has been classified by the International Agency for Research on Cancer (IARC) as an IARC Group 2B carcinogen, meaning it is possibly carcinogenic to humans. The US National Institute for Occupational Safety and Health recommends two separate exposure limits. NIOSH recommends that fine TiO_{2} particles be set at an exposure limit of 2.4 mg/m^{3}, while ultrafine TiO_{2} be set at an exposure limit of 0.3 mg/m^{3}, as time-weighted average concentrations up to 10 hours a day for a 40-hour work week.

Recurring concerns have been expressed about nanophase forms of these materials. Studies of workers with high exposure to TiO_{2} particles indicate that they face heightened risks of inflammation and oxidative stress.

=== Ingestion ===
The safety of titanium dioxide as a food additive is controversial. It was banned as a food additive by the European Union in 2022, after the European Food Safety Authority (EFSA) raised concerns about its safety. This decision has been criticized, and its use is still allowed in many countries, including the United States, Canada, and the United Kingdom.

=== Skin exposure ===
The extent to which healthy skin provides a barrier to TiO_{2}, and whether use on damaged skin and prolonged use can increase risk, are not yet known. Using sunscreens on injured skin or an open wound is not recommended. The IARC recommends against using sprayable sunscreen products given the potential for inhalation.

=== Government policies ===
In 1966 titanium dioxide was approved by the US Food and Drugs Administration (FDA) for use in food as a color ingredient for oral human consumption, as long as it composed 1% or less of the total food. As of 2024, providing it does not exceed 1% by weight of a food product, titanium dioxide was allowed as a food additive in the United States.

Titanium dioxide may be used to increase whiteness and opacity in dairy products (some cheeses, ice cream, and yogurt), candies, frostings, fillings, and many other foods. The FDA regulates the labeling of products containing titanium dioxide, allowing the product's ingredients list to identify titanium dioxide either as "color added" or "artificial colors" or "titanium dioxide"; it does not require that titanium dioxide be explicitly named. In 2026, Consumer Reports reported, among other results, that a 53 gram serving of Hostess Donettes Powdered Mini Donuts contained 261 milligrams of titanium dioxide.

Beginning in 2020, TiO_{2} whitener in food was banned in France, due to uncertainty about safe quantities for human consumption.

In 2021, EFSA ruled that as a consequence of new understandings of nanoparticles, titanium dioxide could "no longer be considered safe as a food additive", and the EU health commissioner announced plans to ban its use across the EU, with discussions beginning in June 2021. EFSA concluded that genotoxicity could not be ruled out, and that a "safe level for daily intake of the food additive could not be established". The European Union removed the authorization to use titanium dioxide (E 171) in foods, effective 7 February 2022, with a six-month grace period. The European Medicines Agency accepts titanium dioxide as a color agent for medicinal products.

In 2022, the UK Food Standards Agency and Food Standards Scotland announced their disagreement with the EFSA ruling, and did not follow the EU in banning titanium dioxide as a food additive. Health Canada similarly reviewed the available evidence in 2022 and decided not to change their position on titanium dioxide as a food additive. Switzerland, Yemen, Qatar, Saudi Arabia, Israel and Turkey also banned titanium dioxide as a food additive.

=== Industry responses ===
Dunkin' Donuts dropped titanium dioxide from their merchandise in 2015 after public pressure.

Mars removed it from their Skittles confectionery in 2025, although a class-action lawsuit against the use of titanium dioxide in Skittles had been dismissed in 2022.

In 2023, the Consumer Healthcare Products Association, a manufacturer's trade group, defended the substance as safe at certain limits while allowing that additional studies could provide further insight, saying an immediate ban would be a "knee-jerk" reaction.

=== Environmental waste ===
Titanium dioxide is mostly introduced into the environment as nanoparticles via wastewater treatment plants. Cosmetic pigments including titanium dioxide enter the wastewater when the product is washed off into sinks after cosmetic use. Once in the sewage treatment plants, pigments separate into sewage sludge which can then be released into the soil when injected into the soil or distributed on its surface. 99% of these nanoparticles wind up on land rather than in aquatic environments due to their retention in sewage sludge. In the environment, titanium dioxide nanoparticles have low to negligible solubility and have been shown to be stable once particle aggregates are formed in soil and water surroundings.

== See also ==
- Delustrant
- Dye-sensitized solar cell
- List of inorganic pigments
- Noxer blocks, TiO_{2}-coated pavers that remove NO_{x} pollutants from the air
- Suboxide
- Surface properties of transition metal oxides
- Titanium dioxide nanoparticle

== Sources ==
This article incorporates text from a free content work. Licensed under CC-BY. Text taken from Production of titanium and titanium dioxide from ilmenite and related applications, WIPO.
