= Anatase =

Mineral form of titanium dioxide

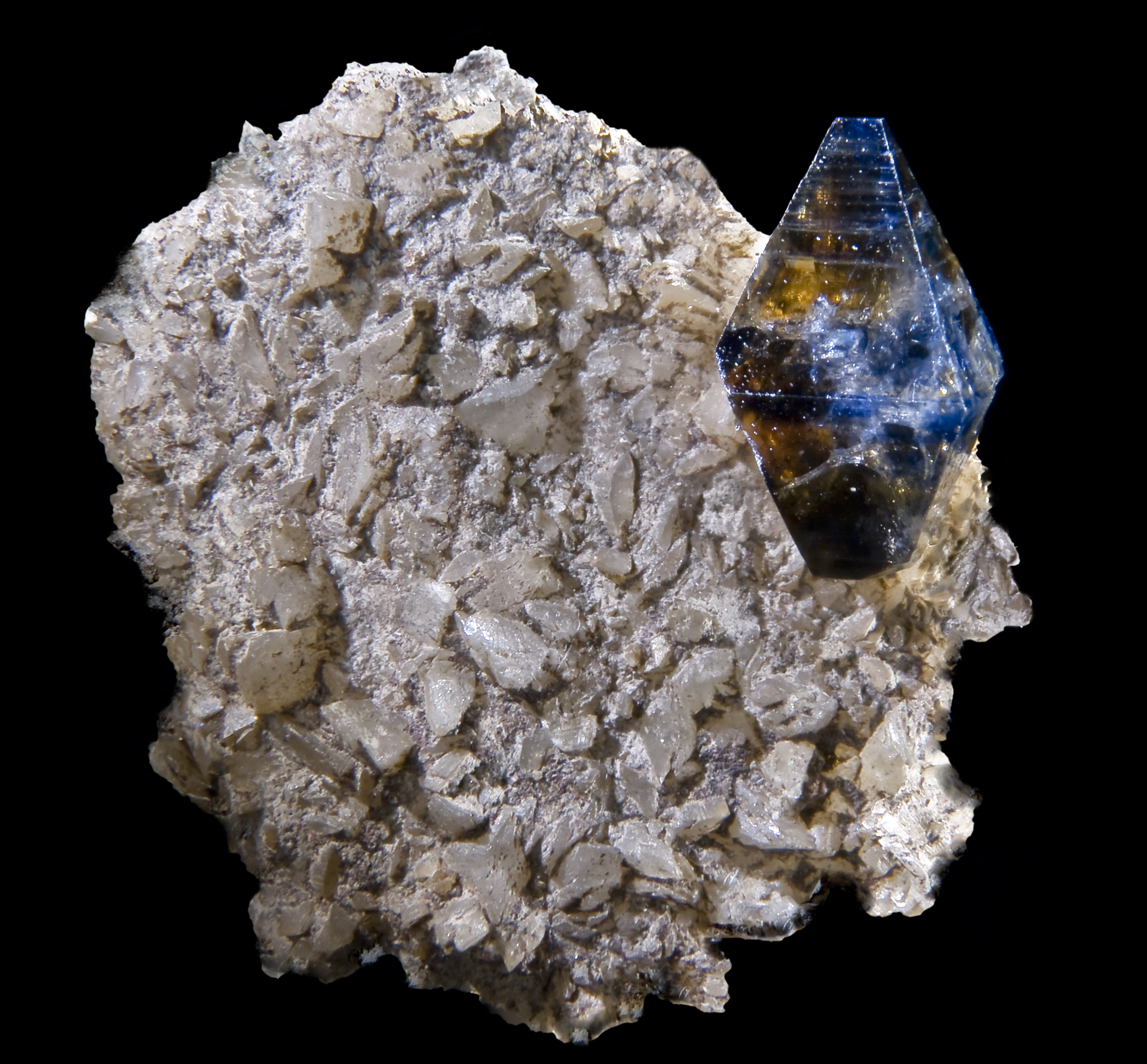

General
- Category: Oxide minerals
- Formula: TiO_{2}
- IMA symbol: Ant
- Strunz classification: 4.DD.05
- Crystal system: Tetragonal
- Crystal class: Ditetragonal dipyramidal (4/mmm); H-M symbol: (4/m 2/m 2/m)
- Space group: I4_{1}/amd
- Unit cell: a = 3.7845, c = 9.5143 [Å]; Z = 4

Identification
- Formula mass: 79.88 g/mol
- Color: Black, reddish to yellowish brown, dark blue, gray
- Crystal habit: Pyramidal (crystals are shaped like pyramids), tabular (form dimensions are thin in one direction).
- Twinning: Rare on {112}
- Cleavage: Perfect on [001] and [011]
- Fracture: Subconchoidal
- Tenacity: Brittle
- Mohs scale hardness: 5.5–6
- Luster: Adamantine to splendent, metallic
- Streak: Pale yellowish white
- Diaphaneity: Transparent to nearly opaque
- Specific gravity: 3.79–3.97
- Optical properties: Uniaxial (−), anomalously biaxial in deeply colored crystals
- Refractive index: n_{ω} = 2.561, n_{ε} = 2.488
- Birefringence: δ = 0.073
- Pleochroism: Weak

Anatase is a metastable mineral form of titanium dioxide (TiO_{2}) with a tetragonal crystal structure. Although colorless or white when pure, anatase in nature is usually a black solid due to impurities. Three other polymorphs (or mineral forms) of titanium dioxide are known to occur naturally: brookite, akaogiite, and rutile, with rutile being the most common and most stable of the bunch. Anatase is formed at relatively low temperatures and found in minor concentrations in igneous and metamorphic rocks. Glass coated with a thin film of TiO_{2} shows antifogging and self-cleaning properties under ultraviolet radiation.

Anatase is always found as small, isolated, and sharply developed crystals, and like rutile, it crystallizes in a tetragonal system. Anatase is metastable at all temperatures and pressures, with rutile being the equilibrium polymorph. Nevertheless, anatase is often the first titanium dioxide phase to form in many processes due to its lower surface energy, with a transformation to rutile taking place at elevated temperatures. Although the degree of symmetry is the same for both anatase and rutile phases, there is no relation between the interfacial angles of the two minerals, except in the prism-zone of 45° and 90°. The common octahedral crystal habit of anatase, with four perfect cleavage planes, has an angle over its polar edge of 82°9', whereas rutile octahedra only has a polar edge angle of 56°52½'. The steeper angle gives anatase crystals a longer vertical axis and skinnier appearance than rutile. Additional important differences exist between the physical characters of anatase and rutile. For example, anatase is less hard (5.5–6 vs. 6–6.5 on the Mohs scale) and less dense (specific gravity about 3.9 vs. 4.2) than rutile. Anatase is also optically negative, whereas rutile is optically positive. Anatase has a more strongly adamantine or metallic-adamantine luster than that of rutile as well.

== Nomenclature ==
The modern name was introduced by René Just Haüy in 1801, but the mineral was known and described before. It derives from Ancient Greek: ἀνάτασις 'stretching out', because the crystals are stretched along an axis compared to other dipyramidal ones.

Another name commonly in use for anatase is octahedrite, which is earlier than anatase and was given by Horace Bénédict de Saussure because of the common (acute) octahedral habit of the crystals. Other names, now obsolete, are oisanite (by Jean-Claude Delamétherie) and dauphinite, from the well-known French locality of Le Bourg-d'Oisans in Dauphiné.

== Crystal habit ==
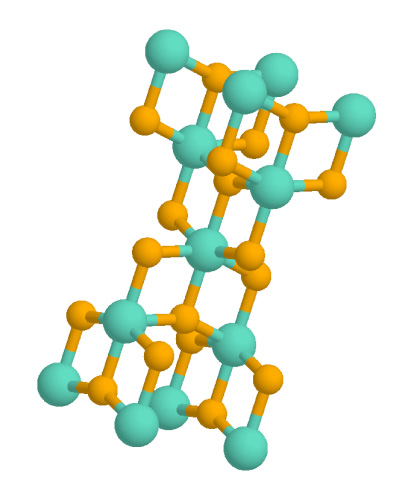
Extended portion of the anatase lattice.

Two growth habits of anatase crystals may be distinguished. The more common occurs as simple acute octahedra with an indigo-blue to black color and steely luster. Crystals of this kind are abundant at Le Bourg-d'Oisans in Dauphiné, France, where they are associated with rock-crystal, feldspar, and axinite in crevices in granite and mica schist. Similar crystals of microscopic size are widely distributed in sedimentary rocks such as sandstones, clays, and slates, from which they may be separated by washing away the lighter constituents of the powdered rock. The (101) plane of anatase is the most thermodynamically stable surface and thus the most widely exposed facet in natural and synthetic anatase.

Crystals of the second type have numerous pyramidal faces developed, and they are usually flatter or sometimes prismatic in habit. Their color is honey-yellow to brown. Such crystals closely resemble the mineral xenotime in appearance and were historically thought to be a special form of xenotime, termed wiserine. They occur attached to the walls of crevices in gneisses in the Alps, a well-known locality being the Binnenthal near Brig in canton Valais, Switzerland.

While anatase is not an equilibrium phase of TiO_{2}, it is metastable near room temperature. At temperatures between 550 and about 1000 °C, anatase converts to rutile. The temperature of this transformation strongly depends on impurities, or dopants, as well as the morphology of the sample.

== Synthetic anatase ==
Due to its potential application as a semiconductor, anatase is often prepared synthetically. Crystalline anatase can be prepared in laboratories by chemical methods such as the sol-gel process. This might be done through controlled hydrolysis of titanium tetrachloride (TiCl_{4}) or titanium ethoxide. Often dopants are included in such synthesis processes to control the morphology, electronic structure, and surface chemistry of an anatase sample.

== See also ==
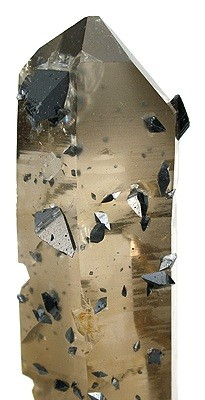
Black anatase crystals on smoky quartz

- Delustrant
- Titanium dioxide
- Rutile
- Brookite
- Akaogiite
- List of minerals
