= Akaogiite =

Rare form of titanium dioxide

General
- Category: Minerals
- Formula: (TiO_{2})
- IMA symbol: Aka

Akaogiite (IMA symbol Aka) is an exceedingly rare mineral, one of the natural forms of titanium dioxide (TiO_{2}). It is a high-pressure polymorph of TiO_{2}, along with anatase, brookite and another high-pressure phase called "TiO_{2} II". Rutile is the stable polymorph of TiO_{2}, most commonly found at standard temperatures and pressures.

Akaogiite can be found at the Nördlinger Ries Crater, a meteor crater in Germany, where the extreme pressure during the impact allowed its formation.
