= Brookite =

Titanium dioxide mineral

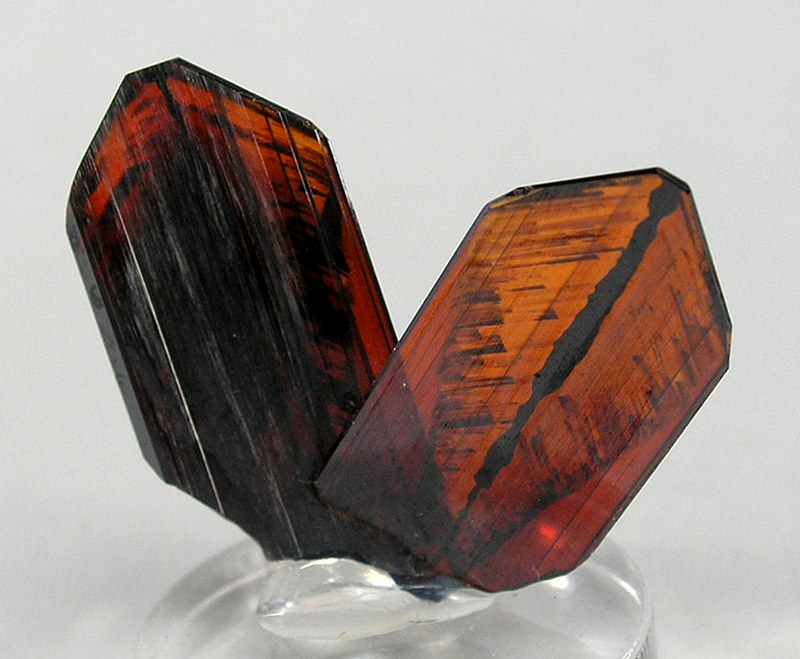
- Brookite from Balochistan

General
- Category: Oxide minerals
- Formula: TiO_{2}
- Strunz classification: 4.DD.10 (10 ed); 4/D.15-10 (8 ed)
- Dana classification: 4.4.5.1
- Crystal system: Orthorhombic
- Crystal class: Dipyramidal (mmm); H-M symbol: (2/m 2/m 2/m)
- Space group: Pbca
- Unit cell: a = 5.4558 Å, b = 9.1819 Å, c = 5.1429 Å; Z = 8

Identification
- Formula mass: 79.88 g/mol
- Color: Deep red, reddish brown, yellowish brown, brown, or black
- Crystal habit: Tabular and striated, pyramidal or pseudohexagonal
- Twinning: On {120}, uncertain
- Cleavage: Poor on {120}, in traces on {001}
- Fracture: Subconchoidal to irregular
- Tenacity: Brittle
- Mohs scale hardness: 5 1/2 to 6
- Luster: Submetallic
- Streak: White, greyish or yellowish
- Diaphaneity: Opaque to translucent
- Specific gravity: 4.08 to 4.18
- Optical properties: Biaxial (+)
- Refractive index: n_{α} = 2.583 n_{β} = 2.584 n_{γ} = 2.700
- Birefringence: δ = 0.117
- Pleochroism: Very weak, yellowish, reddish, orange to brown
- 2V angle: Calculated: 12° to 20°
- Dispersion: 0.131 (compare to diamond at 0.044)
- Ultraviolet fluorescence: Non-fluorescent

Brookite is the orthorhombic variant of titanium dioxide (TiO_{2}), which occurs in four known natural polymorphic forms (minerals with the same composition but different structure). The other three of these forms are akaogiite (monoclinic), anatase (tetragonal) and rutile (tetragonal). Brookite is rare compared to anatase and rutile and, like these forms, it exhibits photocatalytic activity. Brookite also has a larger cell volume than either anatase or rutile, with 8 TiO_{2} groups per unit cell, compared with 4 for anatase and 2 for rutile. Iron (Fe), tantalum (Ta) and niobium (Nb) are common impurities in brookite.

Brookite was named in 1825 by French mineralogist Armand Lévy for Henry James Brooke (1771–1857), an English crystallographer, mineralogist and wool trader.

Arkansite is a variety of brookite from Magnet Cove, Arkansas, US. It is also found in the Murun Massif on the Olyokma-Chara Plateau of Eastern Siberia, Russia, part of the Aldan Shield.

At temperatures above about 750 °C, brookite will revert to the rutile structure.

== Unit cell ==
Brookite belongs to the orthorhombic dipyramidal crystal class 2/m 2/m 2/m (also designated mmm). The space group is Pcab and the unit cell parameters are a = 5.4558 Å, b = 9.1819 Å and c = 5.1429 Å. The formula is TiO_{2}, with 8 formula units per unit cell.

== Structure ==
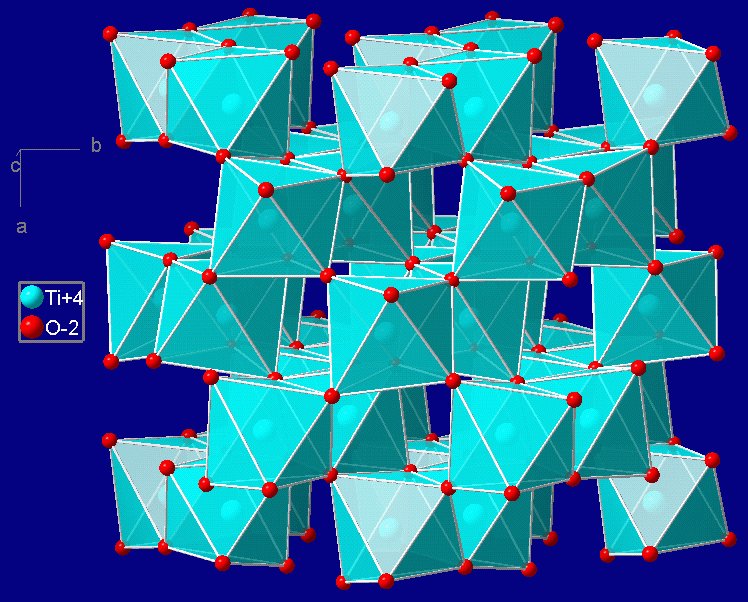
Crystal structure of brookite

The brookite structure is built up of distorted octahedra with a titanium ion at the center and oxygen ions at each of the six vertices. Each octahedron shares three edges with adjoining octahedra, forming an orthorhombic structure.

== Appearance ==
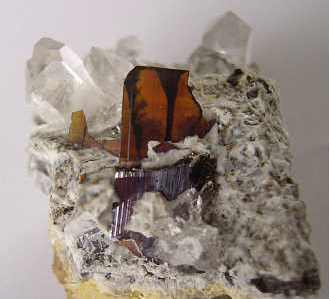
Brookite from Pakistan

Brookite crystals are typically tabular, elongated and striated parallel to their length. They may also be pyramidal, pseudo-hexagonal or prismatic. Brookite and rutile may grow together in an epitaxial relationship.

Brookite is usually brown in color, sometimes yellowish or reddish brown, or even black. Beautiful, deep red crystals (seen above-right) similar to pyrope and almandite garnet are also known. Brookite displays a submetallic luster. It is opaque to translucent, transparent in thin fragments and yellowish brown to dark brown in transmitted light.

== Optical properties ==
Brookite is doubly refracting, as are all orthorhombic minerals, and it is biaxial (+). Refractive indices are very high, above 2.5, which is even higher than diamond at 2.42. For comparison, ordinary window glass has a refractive index of about 1.5.

Brookite exhibits very weak pleochroism, yellowish, reddish and orange to brown. It is neither fluorescent nor radioactive.

== Physical properties ==
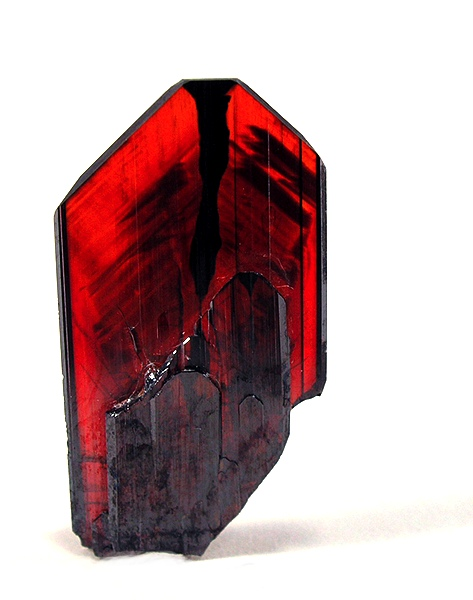
Cherry-red Brookite from Kharan, Balochistan, Pakistan

Brookite is a brittle mineral, with a subconchoidal to irregular fracture and poor cleavage in one direction parallel to the c crystal axis and traces of cleavage in a direction perpendicular to both the a and the b crystal axes. Twinning is uncertain. The mineral has a Mohs hardness of 5 1/2 to 6, between apatite and feldspar. This is the same hardness as anatase and a little less than that of rutile (6 to 6 1/2). The specific gravity is 4.08 to 4.18, between that of anatase at 3.9 and rutile at 4.2.

== Occurrence and associations ==
Brookite is an accessory mineral in alpine veins in gneiss and schist; it is also a common detrital mineral. Associated minerals include its polymorphs anatase and rutile, and also titanite, orthoclase, quartz, hematite, calcite, chlorite and muscovite.

The type locality is Twll Maen Grisial, Fron Olau, Prenteg, Gwynedd, Wales. In 2004, brookite crystals were found in the Kharan, in Balochistan, Pakistan.

== See also ==
- List of minerals
- List of minerals recognized by the International Mineralogical Association
- List of minerals named after people
