= Delustrant =

Substance that reduces the lustre of synthetic fibres

A delustrant is a substance that reduces the lustre (sheen) of synthetic fibres. The most common delustrant is anatase titanium dioxide.

Synthetic fibres, such as nylon, are normally extremely shiny and transparent when extruded. Adding powdered titanium dioxide causes the surface of the fibres to be rougher, reducing the sheen; at the same time, being opaque, it reduces the transparency of the fibre. To be effective as a delustrant, titanium dioxide must be powdered 0.1-1.0 μm, depending on the size of the fibre, and varying amounts (up to about 2%) can be used depending on the level of lustre required.

Some of the words used to describe different lustre levels are: clear, bright, semi-dull, semi-matte, dull, matte, extra dull, and super dull.

== See also ==
- Luster (textiles)
- Hand feel
