= Chloride process =

Method used to separate titanium from its ores

The chloride process is used to separate titanium from its ores. The goal of the process is to win high purity titanium dioxide from ores such as ilmenite (FeTiO_{3}) and rutile (TiO_{2}). The strategy exploits the volatility of TiCl_{4}, which is readily purified and converted to the dioxide. Millions of tons of TiO_{2} are produced annually by this process, mainly for use as white pigments. As of 2017, the chloride process is used alongside the older sulfate process, which relies on hot sulfuric acid to extract iron and other impurities from ores.

== Process chemistry ==
In this process, the feedstock is treated at 1000 °C with carbon and chlorine gas, giving titanium tetrachloride. Typical is the conversion starting from the ore ilmenite:

2 FeTiO_{3} + 7 Cl_{2} + 6 C → 2 TiCl_{4} + 2 FeCl_{3} + 6 CO

The process is a variant of a carbothermic reaction, which exploits the reducing power of carbon.

The titanium tetrachloride is purified by distillation. Other impurities are converted to the respective chlorides as well, but most are less volatile than TiCl_{4}. Vanadium tetrachloride and vanadium oxytrichloride codistill with TiCl_{4}, but these impurities can be removed by chemical reduction.

It can be subsequently oxidized in an oxygen flame or plasma to give the pure titanium dioxide.

TiCl_{4} + O_{2} + heat → TiO_{2} + 2 Cl_{2}

In this way, chlorine is recovered for recycling.

== Process engineering ==
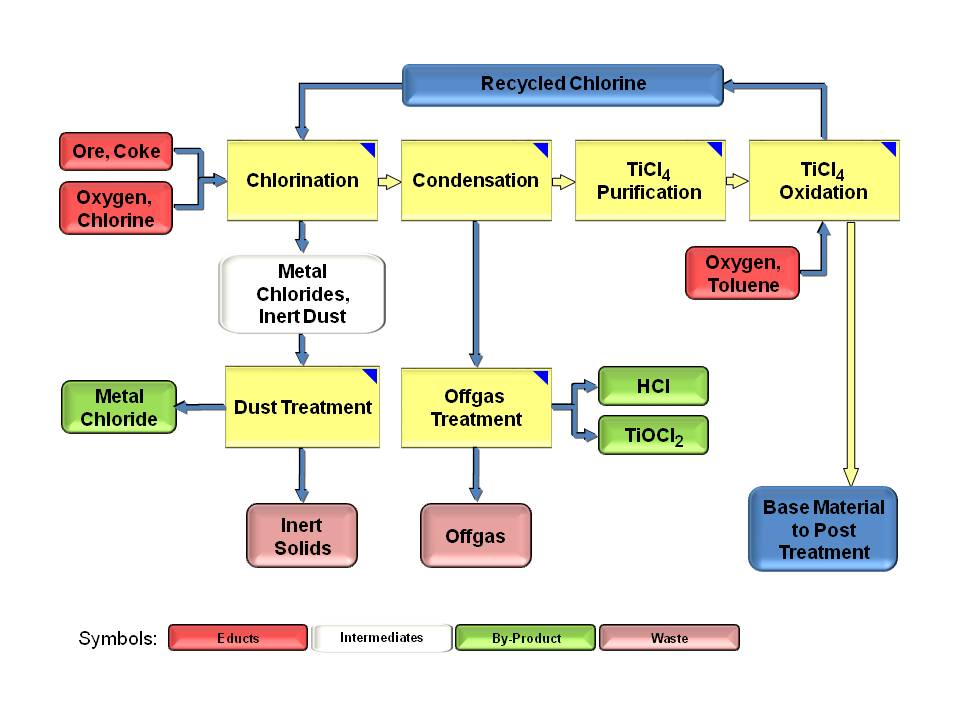
The Chloride Process

The standard chloride process for titanium dioxide base material consists of the following main production units:

- Oxidation
- Chlorination
- Condensation
- Purification

The following auxiliary production units are necessary:

- Ore/coke storage
- Off-Gas Treatment
- Dust treatment

Under steady state conditions the chloride process is a continuous cycle in which chlorine changes from the oxidized state to the reduced state and reverse. The oxidized form of the chlorine is molecular chlorine Cl_{2}, the reduced form is titanium tetrachloride (TiCl_{4}). The oxidizing agent is molecular oxygen (O_{2}), the reducing agent is coke. Both must be fed into the process. The titanium is fed into the process in form of ore together with the coke. Titanium ore is a mixture of oxides. The added O_{2} leaves the process with the product TiO_{2}, the added coke leaves the process together with the added oxygen from the titanium ore in form of CO and CO_{2}. The other fed metals leave the process in form of metal chlorides.
