= Ilmenite =

Titanium-iron(II) oxide mineral

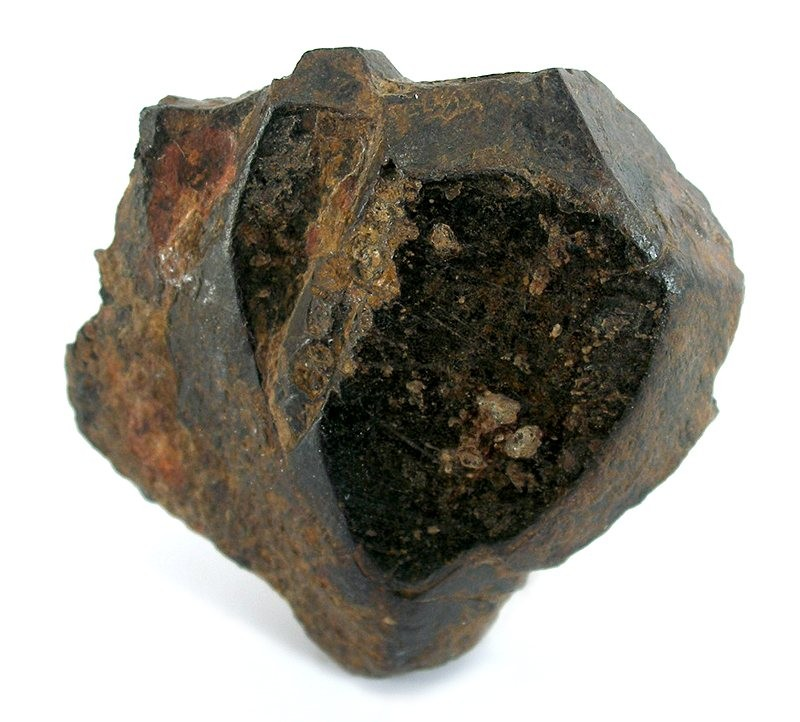
- Ilmenite from Miass, Ilmen Mts, Chelyabinsk Oblast', Southern Urals, Urals Region, Russia. 4.5 x 4.3 x 1.5 cm

General
- Category: Oxide mineral
- Formula: Iron(II) titanium oxide, Fe^{II}TiO_{3}
- IMA symbol: Ilm
- Strunz classification: 4.CB.05
- Dana classification: 04.03.05.01
- Crystal system: Trigonal
- Crystal class: Rhombohedral (3̅); H-M symbol: (3̅)
- Space group: R3̅ (no. 148)
- Unit cell: a = 5.08854(7) c = 14.0924(3) [Å]: Z = 6

Identification
- Color: Iron-black; gray with a brownish tint in reflected light
- Crystal habit: Granular to massive and lamellar exsolutions in hematite or magnetite
- Twinning: {0001} simple, {101̅1} lamellar
- Cleavage: Absent; parting on {0001} and {101̅1}
- Fracture: Conchoidal to subconchoidal
- Tenacity: Brittle
- Mohs scale hardness: 5–6
- Luster: Metallic to submetallic
- Streak: Black
- Diaphaneity: Opaque
- Specific gravity: 4.70–4.79
- Optical properties: Uniaxial (–)
- Birefringence: Strong; O: pinkish brown, E: dark brown (bireflectance)
- Other characteristics: Weakly magnetic; Liquidus = 1710°C (peritectic)

Ilmenite is a titanium-iron(II) oxide mineral with the idealized formula FeTiO_{3}. It is a weakly magnetic black or steel-gray solid. Ilmenite is the most important ore of titanium and the main source of titanium dioxide, which is used as white pigment in paints, printing inks, fabrics, plastics, paper, sunscreen, food and cosmetics.

== Structure and properties ==
Ilmenite is a heavy (specific gravity 4.7), moderately hard (Mohs hardness 5.6 to 6), opaque black mineral with a submetallic luster. It is almost always massive, with thick tabular crystals being quite rare. It shows no discernible cleavage, breaking instead with a conchoidal to uneven fracture.

Ilmenite crystallizes in the trigonal system with space group R3̅. The ilmenite crystal structure consists of an ordered derivative of the corundum structure; in corundum all cations are identical but in ilmenite Fe^{2+} and Ti^{4+} ions occupy alternating layers perpendicular to the trigonal c axis.

Pure ilmenite is paramagnetic (showing only very weak attraction to a magnet), but ilmenite forms solid solutions with hematite that are weakly ferromagnetic and so are noticeably attracted to a magnet. Natural deposits of ilmenite usually contain intergrown or exsolved magnetite that also contribute to its ferromagnetism.

Ilmenite is distinguished from hematite by its less intensely black color and duller appearance and its black streak, and from magnetite by its weaker magnetism.

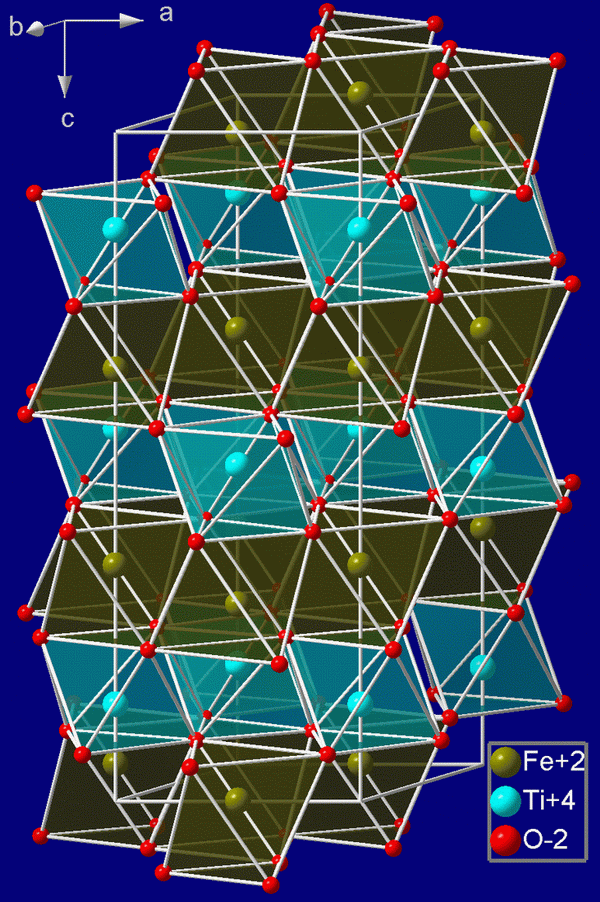
Crystal structure of ilmenite

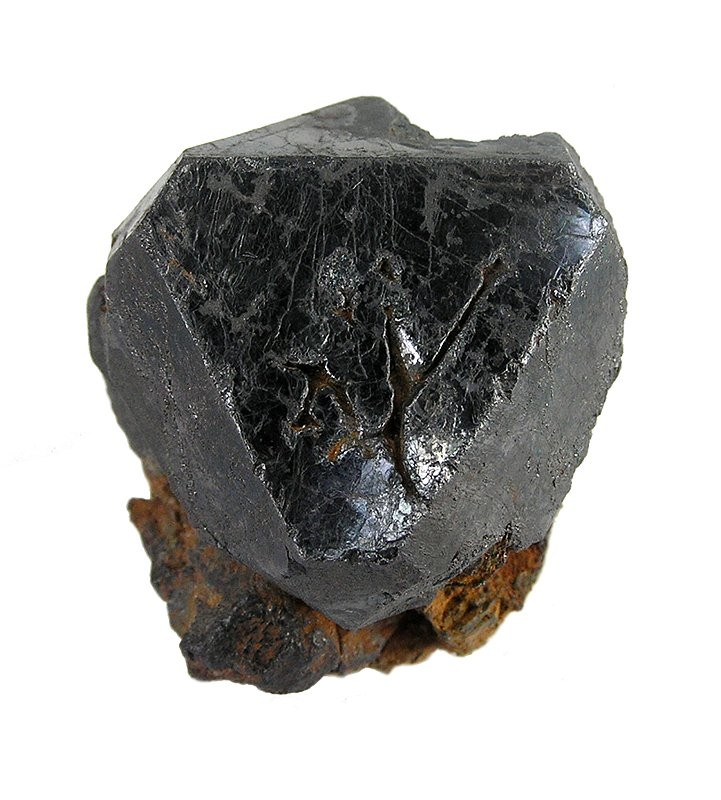
Ilmenite from Froland, Aust-Agder, Norway; 4.1 × 4.1 × 3.8 cm

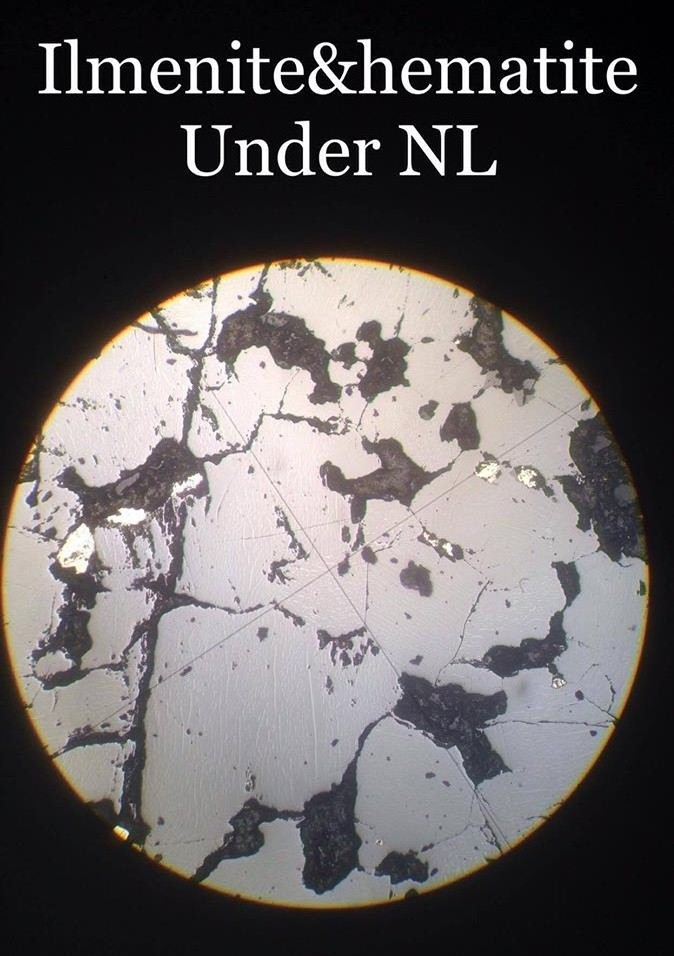
Ilmenite and hematite under normal light

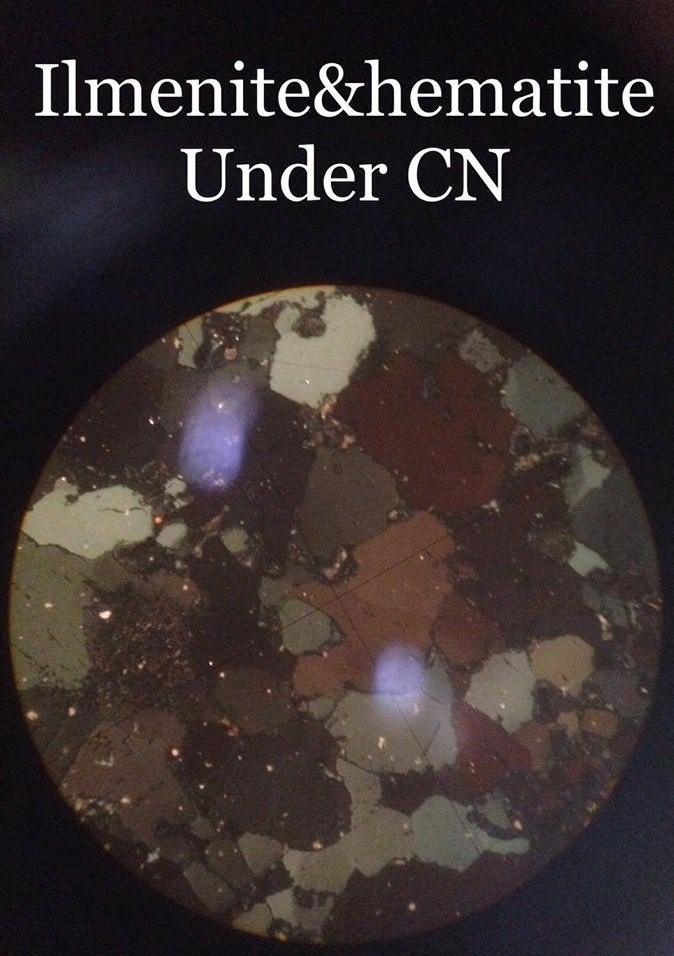
Ilmenite and hematite under polarized light

== Discovery ==
In 1791, William Gregor discovered a deposit of black sand in a stream that runs through the valley just south of the village of Manaccan (Cornwall), and identified for the first time titanium as one of the constituents of the main mineral in the sand. Gregor named this mineral manaccanite. The same mineral was found in the Ilmensky Mountains, near Miass, Russia, and named ilmenite.

== Mineral chemistry ==
Pure ilmenite has the composition FeTiO_{3}. However, ilmenite most often contains appreciable quantities of magnesium and manganese and up to 6 wt% of hematite, Fe_{2}O_{3}, substituting for FeTiO_{3} in the crystal structure. Thus the complete chemical formula can be expressed as (Fe,Mg,Mn,Ti)O_{3}. Ilmenite forms a solid solution with geikielite (MgTiO_{3}) and pyrophanite (MnTiO_{3}) which are magnesian and manganiferous end-members of the solid solution series.

Although ilmenite is typically close to the ideal FeTiO_{3} composition, with minor mole percentages of Mn and Mg, the ilmenites of kimberlites usually contain substantial amounts of geikielite molecules, and in some highly differentiated felsic rocks ilmenites may contain significant amounts of pyrophanite molecules.

At temperatures above 950 °C (1,740 °F), there is a complete solid solution between ilmenite and hematite. There is a miscibility gap at lower temperatures, resulting in a coexistence of these two minerals in rocks but no solid solution. This coexistence may result in exsolution lamellae in cooled ilmenites with more iron in the system than can be homogeneously accommodated in the crystal lattice. Ilmenite containing 6 to 13 percent Fe_{2}O_{3} is sometimes described as ferrian ilmenite.

Ilmenite alters or weathers to form the pseudo-mineral leucoxene, a fine-grained yellowish to grayish or brownish material enriched to 70% or more of TiO_{2}. Leucoxene is an important source of titanium in heavy mineral sands ore deposits.

== Paragenesis ==
Ilmenite is a common accessory mineral found in igneous and high-grade metamorphic rocks. It is found in large concentrations in layered intrusions where it forms as part of a cumulate layer within the intrusion. Ilmenite generally occurs in these cumulates together with orthopyroxene or in combination with plagioclase and apatite (nelsonite).

Magnesian ilmenite is formed in kimberlites as part of the MARID association of minerals (mica-amphibole-rutile-ilmenite-diopside) assemblage of glimmerite xenoliths. Manganiferous ilmenite is found in granitic rocks and also in carbonatite intrusions where it may also contain anomalously high amounts of niobium.

Many mafic igneous rocks contain grains of intergrown magnetite and ilmenite, formed by the oxidation of ulvospinel.

== Processing and consumption ==
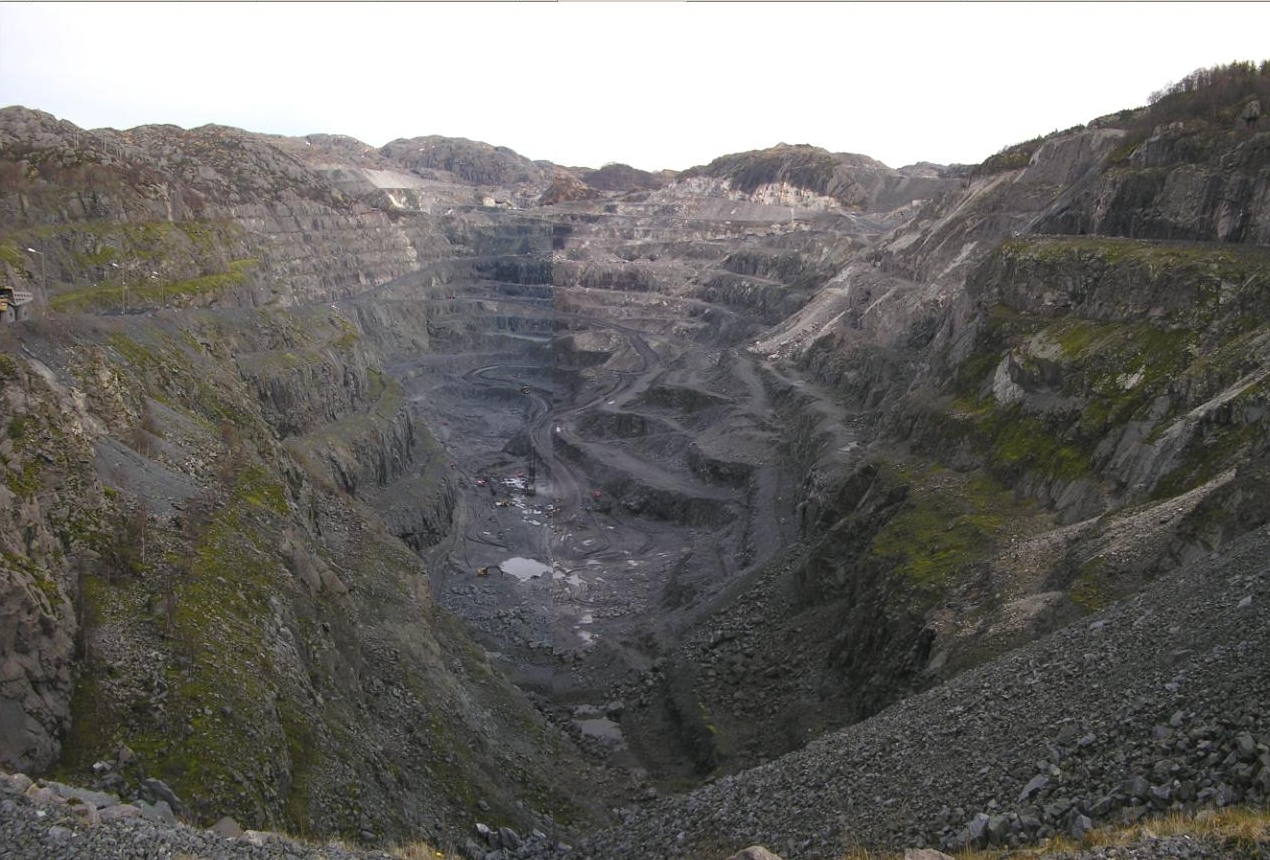
Tellnes opencast ilmenite mine, Sokndal Municipality, Norway

Most ilmenite is mined for titanium dioxide production. Ilmenite and titanium dioxide are used in the production of titanium metal.

Titanium dioxide is most used as a white pigment, and the major consuming industries for TiO_{2} pigments are paints and surface coatings, plastics, and paper and paperboard. Per capita consumption of TiO_{2} in China is about 1.1 kilograms per year, compared with 2.7 kilograms for Western Europe and the United States.

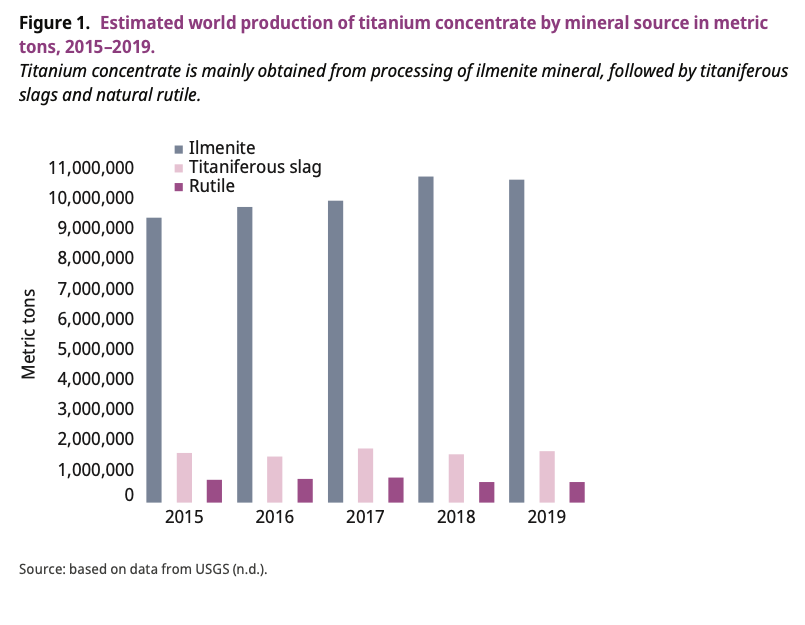
Estimated world production of titanium concentrate by mineral source in metric tons, 2015–2019. Titanium concentrate is mainly obtained from the processing of ilmenite mineral, followed by titaniferous slags and natural rutile.

Titanium is the ninth most abundant element on Earth and represents about 0.6 percent of the Earth's crust. Ilmenite is commonly processed to obtain a titanium concentrate, which is called "synthetic rutile" if it contains more than 90 percent TiO_{2}, or more generally "titaniferous slags" if it has a lower TiO_{2} content. More than 80 percent of the estimated global production of titanium concentrate is obtained from the processing of ilmenite, while 13 percent is obtained from titaniferous slags and 5 percent from rutile.

Ilmenite can be converted into pigment-grade titanium dioxide via either the sulfate process or the chloride process. Ilmenite can also be improved and purified to titanium dioxide in the form of rutile using the Becher process.

Ilmenite ores can also be converted to liquid iron and a titanium-rich slag using a smelting process.

Steelmakers use ilmenite ore as a flux to line the blast furnace hearth refractory.

Ilmenite can be used to produce ferrotitanium via an aluminothermic reduction.

== Feedstock production ==
Various ilmenite feedstock grades.
Feedstock	TiO_{2} Content	Process
	(%)	
Ore	<55	Sulfate
Ore	>55	Chloride
Ore	<50	Smelting (slag)
Synthetic rutile	88–95	Chloride
Chloride slag	85–95	Chloride
Sulfate slag	80	Sulfate

Estimated contained TiO_{2}. production (Metric tpa x 1,000, ilmenite & rutile)
Year	2011	2012–13
Country	USGS	Projected
Australia	1,300	247
South Africa	1,161	190
Mozambique	516	250
Canada	700	
India	574	
China	500	
Vietnam	490	
Ukraine	357	
Senegal	-	330
Norway	300	
United States	300	
Madagascar	288	
Kenya	-	246
Sri Lanka	62	
Sierra Leone	60	
Brazil	48	
Other countries	37	
Total world	~6,700	~1,250

Most ilmenite is recovered from heavy mineral sands ore deposits, where the mineral is concentrated as a placer deposit and weathering reduces its iron content, increasing the percentage of titanium. However, ilmenite can also be recovered from "hard rock" titanium ore sources, such as ultramafic to mafic layered intrusions or anorthosite massifs. The ilmenite in layered intrusions is sometimes abundant, but it contains considerable intergrowths of magnetite that reduce its ore grade. Ilmenite from anorthosite massifs often contains large amounts of calcium or magnesium that render it unsuitable for the chloride process.

The proven reserves of ilmenite and rutile ores are estimated to be between 423 and 600 million tonnes of titanium dioxide. The largest ilmenite deposits are in South Africa, India, the United States, Canada, Norway, Australia, Ukraine, Russia and Kazakhstan. Additional deposits are found in Bangladesh, Chile, Mexico and New Zealand.

Australia was the world's largest ilmenite ore producer in 2011, with about 1.3 million tonnes of production, followed by South Africa, Canada, Mozambique, India, China, Vietnam, Ukraine, Norway, Madagascar and the United States.

The top four ilmenite and rutile feedstock producers in 2010 were Rio Tinto Group, Iluka Resources, Exxaro and Kenmare Resources, which collectively accounted for more than 60% of the world's supplies.

The world's two largest open cast ilmenite mines are:

- The Tellnes mine located in Sokndal Municipality, Norway, and run by Titania AS (owned by Kronos Worldwide Inc.) with 0.55 Mtpa capacity and 57 Mt contained TiO_{2} reserves.
- The Rio Tinto Group's Lac Tio mine located near Havre Saint-Pierre, Quebec, in Canada with a 3 Mtpa capacity and 52 Mt reserves.

Major mineral sands-based ilmenite mining operations include:

- Richards Bay Minerals in South Africa, majority-owned by the Rio Tinto Group.
- Kenmare Resources' Moma mine in Mozambique.
- Iluka Resources' mining operations in Australia, including Murray Basin, Eneabba and Capel.
- The Kerala Minerals & Metals Ltd (KMML), Indian Rare Earths (IRE), VV Mineral mines in India.
- TiZir Ltd.'s Grande Cote mine in Senegal
- QIT Madagascar Minerals mine, majority-owned by the Rio Tinto Group, which began production in 2009 and is expected to produce 0.75 Mtpa of ilmenite, potentially expanding to 2 Mtpa in future phases.

Attractive major potential ilmenite deposits include:

- The Karhujupukka magnetite-ilmenite deposit in Kolari, northern Finland, with around 5 Mt reserves and ore containing about 6.2% titanium.
- The Balla Balla magnetite-iron-titanium-vanadium ore deposit in the Pilbara of Western Australia, which contains 456 million tonnes of cumulate ore horizon grading 45% Fe, 13.7% TiO_{2} and 0.64% V_{2}O_{5}, one of the richest magnetite-ilmenite ore bodies in Australia
- The Coburn, WIM 50, Douglas, Pooncarie mineral sands deposits in Australia.
- The Magpie titano-magnetite (iron-titanium-vanadium-chrome) deposits in eastern Quebec of Canada with about 1 billion tonnes containing about 43% Fe, 12% TiO_{2}, 0.4% V_{2}O_{5}, and 2.2% Cr_{2}O_{3}.
- The Longnose deposit in Northeast Minnesota is considered to be "the largest and richest ilmenite deposit in North America."

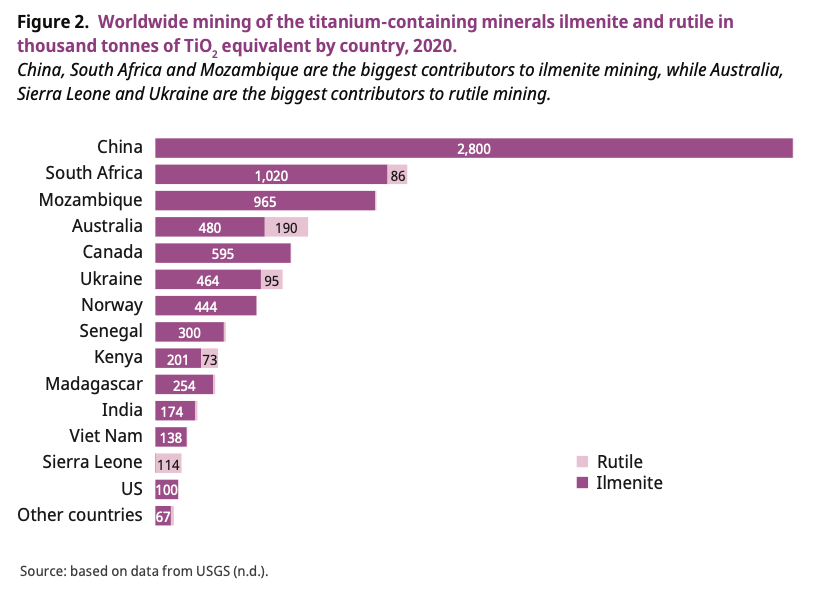
Worldwide mining of the titanium-containing minerals ilmenite and rutile in thousand tonnes of TiO_{2} equivalent by country, in 2020.

In 2020, China had by far the highest titanium mining activity. About 35 percent of the world's ilmenite is mined in China, representing 33 percent of total titanium mineral mining (including ilmenite and rutile). South Africa and Mozambique are also important contributors, representing 13 percent and 12 percent of worldwide ilmenite mining, respectively. Australia represents 6 percent of the total ilmenite mining and 31 percent of rutile mining. Sierra Leone and Ukraine are also big contributors to rutile mining.

China is the biggest producer of titanium dioxide, followed by the United States and Germany. China is also a leader in titanium metal production, but Japan, the Russian Federation, and Kazakhstan have emerged as significant contributors to this field.

== Patenting activities ==
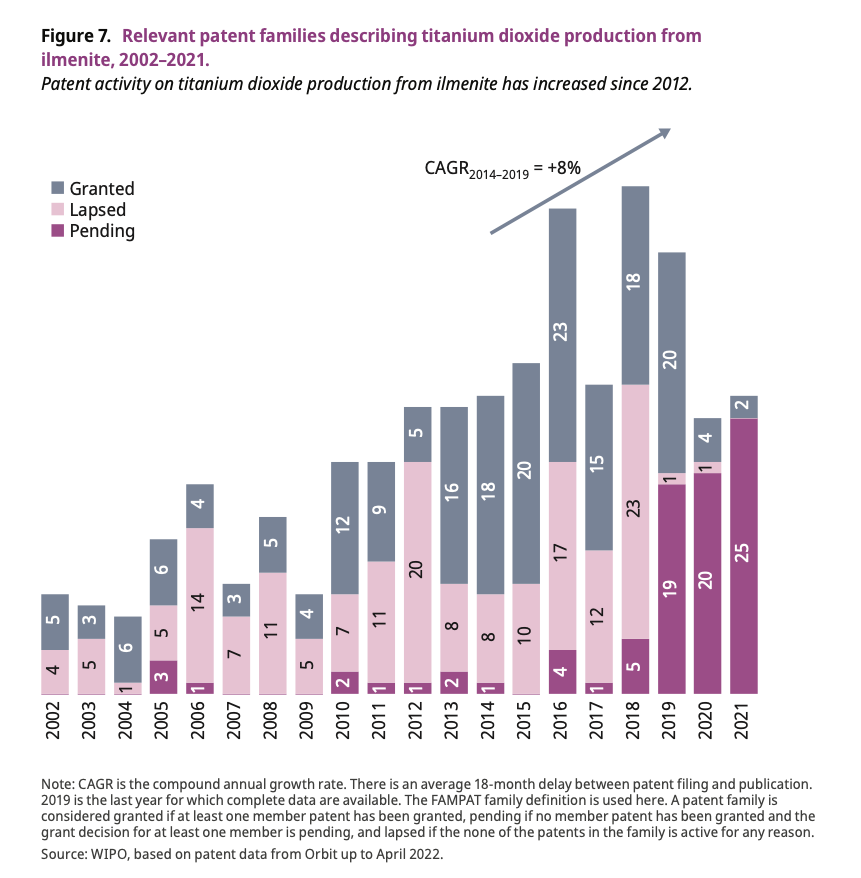
Patent activity on titanium dioxide production from ilmenite has increased since 2012.

Patenting activity related to titanium dioxide production from ilmenite is rapidly increasing. Between 2002 and 2022, there have been 459 patent families that describe the production of titanium dioxide from ilmenite, and this number is growing rapidly. The majority of these patents describe pre-treatment processes, such as smelting and magnetic separation, to increase the titanium concentration in low-grade ores, resulting in titanium concentrates or slags. Other patents describe processes for obtaining titanium dioxide, either through a direct hydrometallurgical process or via two industrially exploited processes: the sulfate process and the chloride process.

Acid leaching might be used either as a pre-treatment or as part of a hydrometallurgical process to directly obtain titanium dioxide or synthetic rutile (>90 percent titanium dioxide, TiO_{2}). The sulfate process represents 40 percent of the world's titanium dioxide production and is protected in 23 percent of patent families. The chloride process is only mentioned in 8 percent of patent families, although it provides 60 percent of the worldwide industrial production of titanium dioxide.

Key contributors to patents on the production of titanium dioxide are companies from China, Australia and the United States, reflecting the major contribution of these countries to industrial production. Chinese companies Pangang and Lomon Billions Groups are the main contributors and hold diversified patent portfolios covering both pre-treatment and the processes leading to a final product.

In comparison, patenting activity related to titanium metal production from ilmenite remains stable. Between 2002 and 2022, there have been 92 patent families that describe the production of titanium metal from ilmenite, and this number has remained relatively steady. These patents describe the production of titanium metal starting from mineral ores, such as ilmenite, and from titanium dioxide (TiO_{2}) and titanium tetrachloride (TiCl_{4}), a chemical obtained as an intermediate in the chloride process. The starting materials are purified, if necessary, and then converted to titanium metal through a chemical reduction process using a reducing agent. Processes mainly differ regarding the reducing agent used to transform the starting material into titanium metal: magnesium is the most frequently cited reducing agent and the most exploited in industrial production.

Key players in the field are Japanese companies, in particular Toho Titanium and Osaka Titanium Technologies, both focusing on reduction using magnesium. Pangang also contributes to titanium metal production and holds patents describing reduction by molten salt electrolysis.

== Lunar ilmenite ==
Ilmenite has been found in lunar samples, particularly in high-Ti lunar mare basalts common from Apollo 11 and Apollo 17 sites, and on average, constitutes up to 5% of lunar meteorites. Ilmenite has been targeted for ISRU water and oxygen extraction due to a simplistic reduction reaction which occurs with CO and H_{2} buffers. The European Space Agency's VMMO mission, expected to launch in 2028, intends to map the distribution of ilmenite on the Moon.

== Sources ==
This article incorporates text from a free content work. Licensed under CC-BY. Text taken from Production of titanium and titanium dioxide from ilmenite and related applications, WIPO.
