= Rutile =

Oxide mineral composed of titanium dioxide

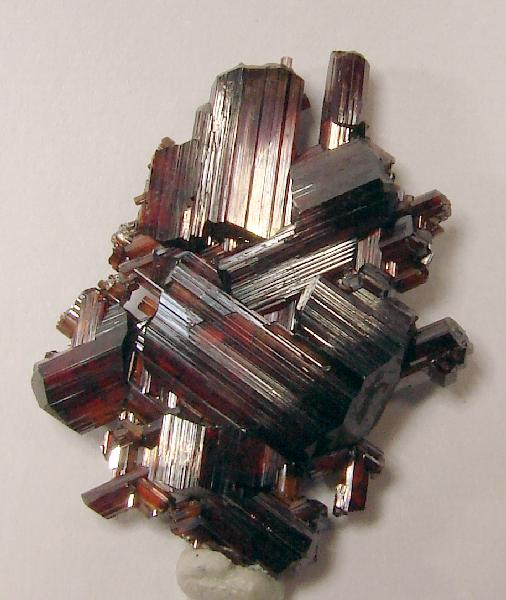

General
- Category: Oxide minerals
- Formula: TiO_{2}
- IMA symbol: Rt
- Strunz classification: 4.DB.05
- Crystal system: Tetragonal
- Crystal class: Ditetragonal dipyramidal (4/mmm); H-M symbol: (4/m 2/m 2/m)
- Space group: P4_{2}/mnm
- Unit cell: a = 4.5937 Å, c = 2.9587 Å; Z = 2

Identification
- Color: Brown, reddish brown, blood red, red, brownish yellow, pale yellow, yellow, pale blue, violet, rarely grass-green, grayish black; black if high in Nb–Ta
- Crystal habit: Acicular to Prismatic crystals, elongated and striated parallel to [001]
- Twinning: Common on {011}, or {031}; as contact twins with two, six, or eight individuals, cyclic, polysynthetic
- Cleavage: Prismatic, {110} good, {100} moderate, parting on {092} and {011}
- Fracture: Uneven to sub-conchoidal
- Mohs scale hardness: 6.0–6.5
- Luster: Adamantine to metallic
- Streak: Bright red to dark red
- Diaphaneity: Opaque, transparent in thin fragments
- Specific gravity: 4.23 increasing with Nb–Ta content
- Optical properties: Uniaxial (+)
- Refractive index: n_{ω} = 2.613, n_{ε} = 2.909 (589 nm)
- Birefringence: 0.296 (589 nm)
- Pleochroism: Weak to distinct brownish red-green-yellow
- Dispersion: Strong
- Fusibility: Fusible in alkali carbonates
- Solubility: Insoluble in acids
- Common impurities: Fe, Nb, Ta
- Other characteristics: Strongly anisotropic

Rutile is an oxide mineral composed of titanium dioxide (TiO_{2}), and is the most common natural form of TiO_{2}. Rarer polymorphs of TiO_{2} are known, including anatase, akaogiite, and brookite.

Rutile has one of the highest refractive indices at visible wavelengths of any known crystal and also exhibits a particularly large birefringence and high dispersion. Owing to these properties, it is useful for the manufacture of certain optical elements, especially polarization optics, for longer visible and infrared wavelengths up to about 4.5 micrometres. Natural rutile may contain up to 10% iron and significant amounts of niobium and tantalum.

Rutile derives its name from the Latin rutilus ('red'), in reference to the deep red color observed in some specimens when viewed by transmitted light. Rutile was first described in 1803 by Abraham Gottlob Werner using specimens obtained in Horcajuelo de la Sierra, Madrid (Spain), which is consequently the type locality.

== Occurrence ==
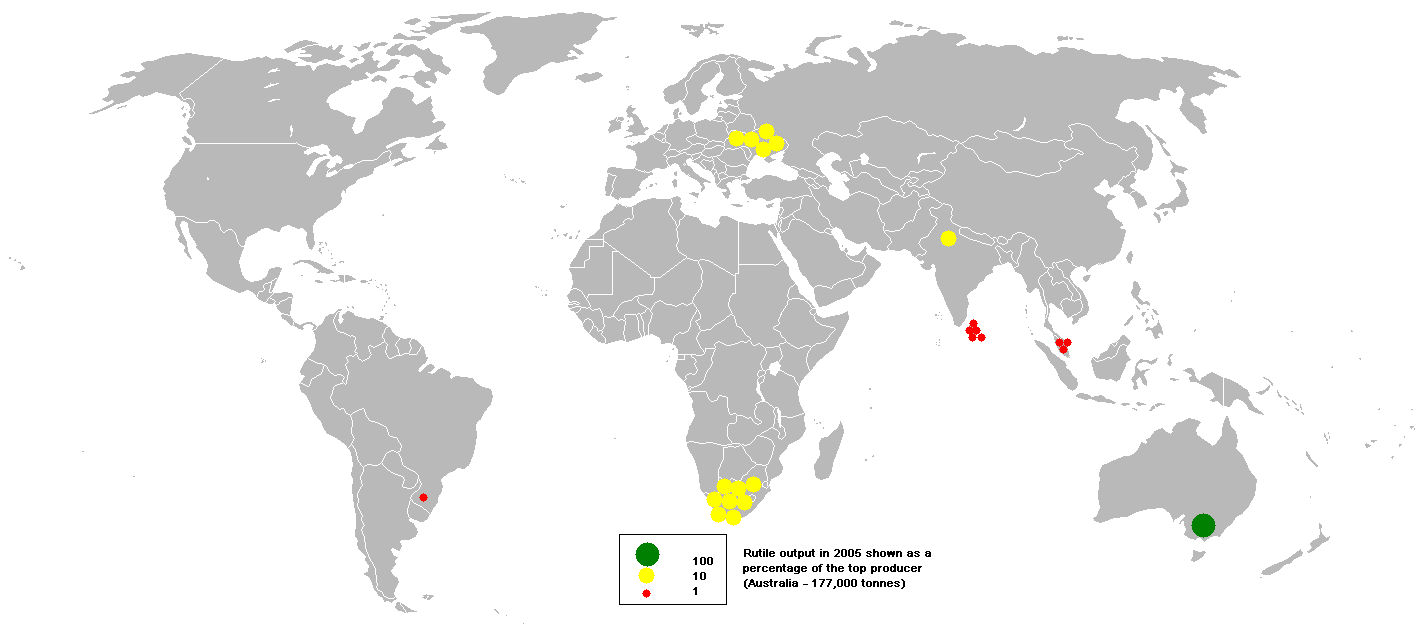
Rutile output in 2005

Rutile is a common accessory mineral in high-temperature and high-pressure metamorphic rocks and in igneous rocks.

Thermodynamically, rutile is the most stable polymorph of TiO_{2} at all temperatures, exhibiting lower total free energy than metastable phases of anatase or brookite. Consequently, the transformation of the metastable TiO_{2} polymorphs to rutile is irreversible. As it has the lowest molecular volume of the three main polymorphs, it is generally the primary titanium-bearing phase in most high-pressure metamorphic rocks, chiefly eclogites.

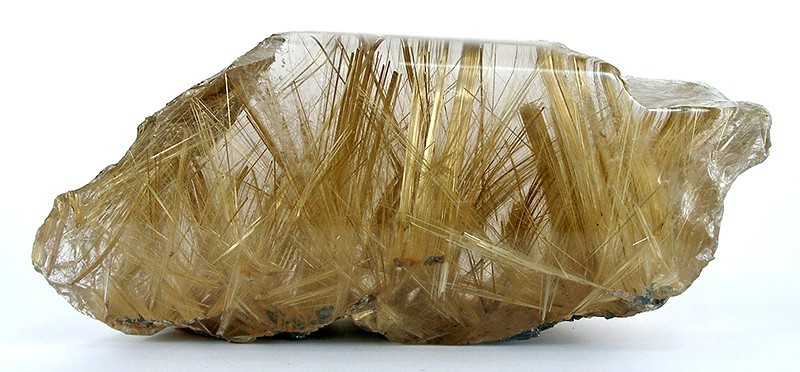
Rutile in quartz

Within the igneous environment, rutile is a common accessory mineral in plutonic igneous rocks. However, it is also found occasionally in extrusive igneous rocks, particularly those such as kimberlites and lamproites that have deep mantle sources. Anatase and brookite are found in the igneous environment, particularly as products of autogenic alteration during the cooling of plutonic rocks; anatase is also found in placer deposits sourced from primary rutile.

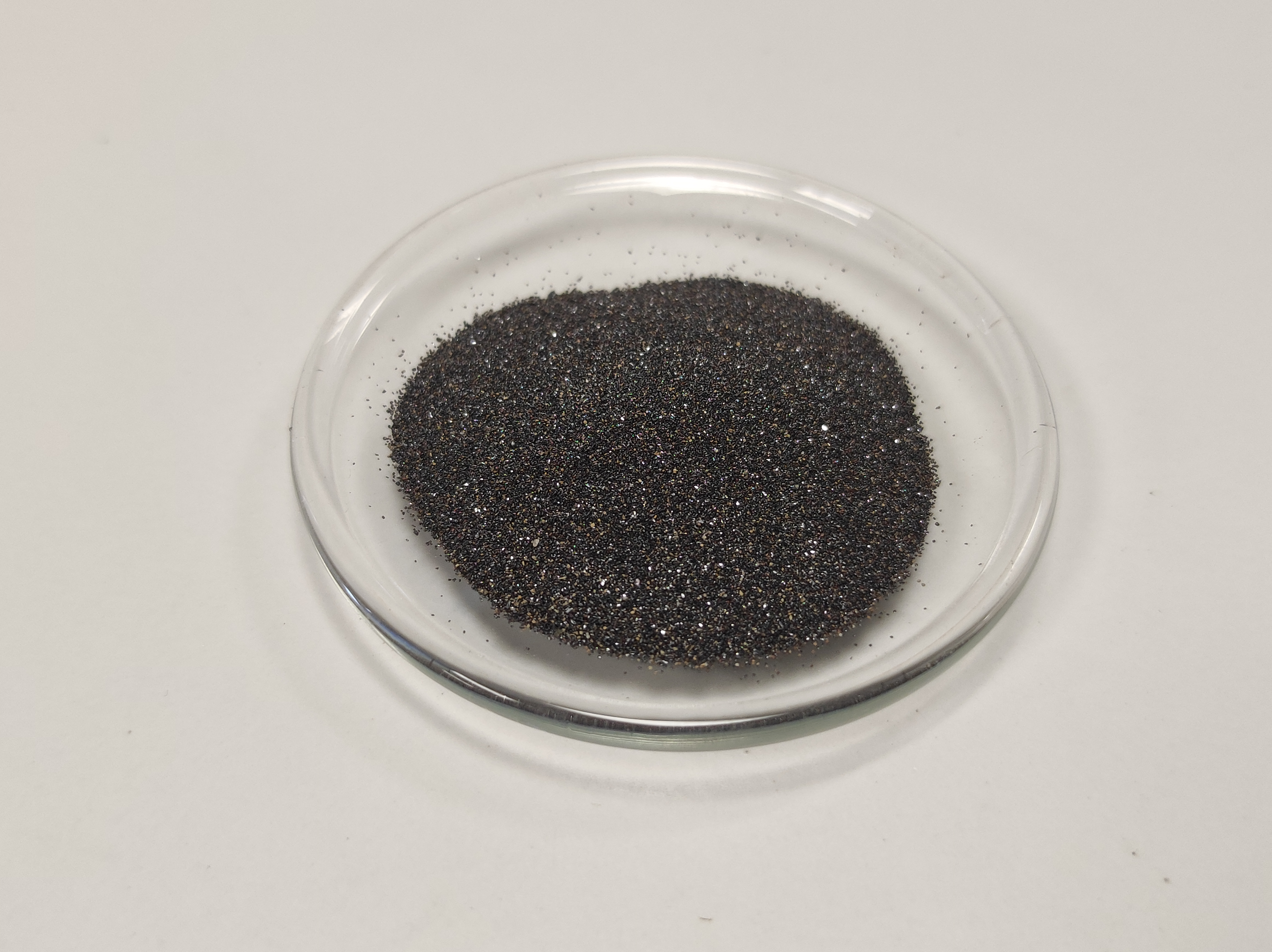
Milled rutile

The occurrence of large specimen crystals is most common in pegmatites, skarns, and granite greisens. Rutile is found as an accessory mineral in some altered igneous rocks, and in certain gneisses and schists. In groups of acicular crystals it is frequently seen penetrating quartz as in the fléches d'amour from Graubünden, Switzerland. In 2005, the Republic of Sierra Leone in West Africa had a production capacity of 23% of the world's annual rutile supply, which rose to approximately 30% in 2008.

== Crystal structure ==
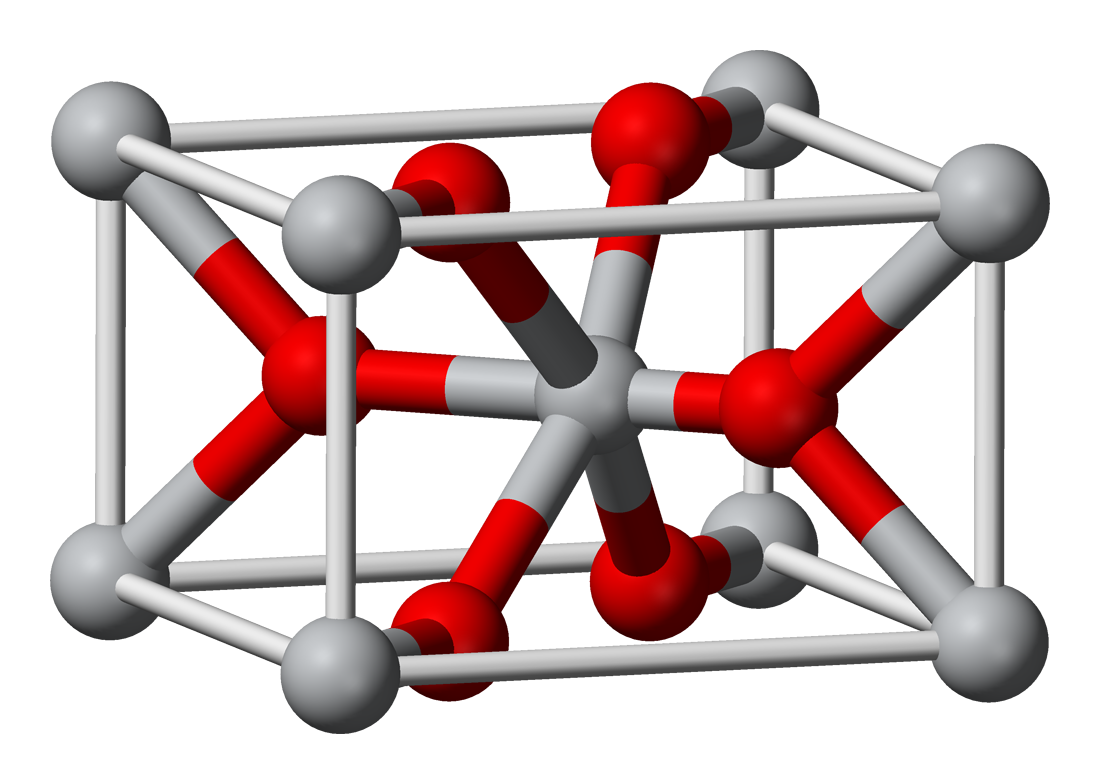
The unit cell of rutile. Ti atoms are gray; O atoms are red.

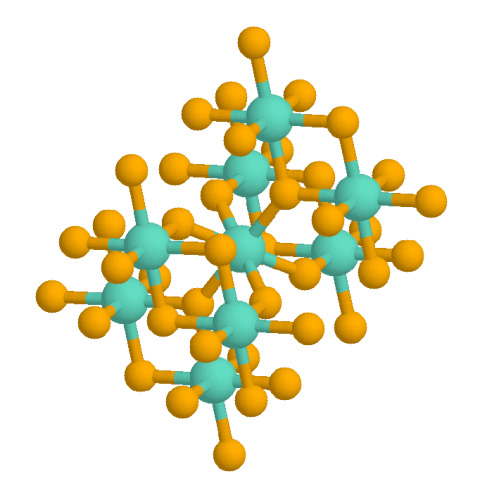
Extended crystal structure of rutile

The structure of rutile is so classic that it is discussed in textbooks as a reference motif, much like sodium chloride and nickel arsenide. The structure is adopted by not only TiO_{2}, but also by GeO_{2}, RuO_{2}, SnO_{2}, MnO_{2}, VO_{2}, IrO_{2}, and CrO_{2}. ZrO_{2} and HfO_{2} adopt another classical structural motif, the fluorite structure.

In the rutile motif, the metal "cations" have a coordination number of 6, meaning they are surrounded by an octahedral array of 6 oxygen atoms. The oxygen anions have a coordination number of 3, in a trigonal planar coordination. Rutile also shows a screw axis when its octahedra are viewed sequentially. When formed under reducing conditions, oxygen vacancies can occur, coupled to Ti^{3+} centers. Hydrogen can enter these gaps, existing as an individual vacancy occupant (pairing as a hydrogen ion) or creating a hydroxide group with an adjacent oxygen.

Rutile crystals are most commonly observed to exhibit a prismatic or acicular growth habit with preferential orientation along their c axis, the [001] direction. This growth habit is favored as the {110} facets of rutile exhibit the lowest surface free energy and are therefore thermodynamically most stable. The c-axis oriented growth of rutile appears clearly in nanorods, nanowires and abnormal grain growth phenomena of this phase.

== Application ==
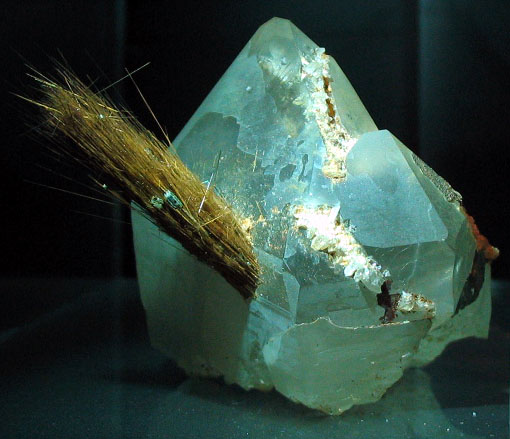
Acicular crystals of rutile protruding from a quartz crystal

In large enough quantities in beach sands, rutile forms an important constituent of heavy minerals and ore deposits. Miners extract and separate the valuable minerals – e.g., rutile, zircon, and ilmenite. The main uses for rutile are the manufacture of refractory ceramic, as a pigment, and for the production of titanium metal.

Finely powdered rutile is a brilliant white pigment and is used in paints, plastics, paper, foods, and other applications that call for a bright white color. Titanium dioxide pigment is the single greatest use of titanium worldwide. Nanoscale particles of rutile are transparent to visible light but are highly effective in the absorption of ultraviolet radiation (sunscreen). The UV absorption of nano-sized rutile particles is blue-shifted compared to bulk rutile, so that the nanoparticles absorb higher-energy UV light. Hence, they are used in sunscreens to protect against UV-induced skin damage.

Small rutile needles present in gems are responsible for an optical phenomenon known as asterism. Asteriated gems are known as "star" gems. Star sapphires, star rubies, and other star gems are highly sought after and are generally more valuable than their normal counterparts.

Rutile is widely used as a welding electrode covering. It is also used as a part of the ZTR index, which classifies highly weathered sediments.

=== Semiconductor ===
Rutile, as a large band-gap semiconductor, has in recent decades been the subject of significant research towards applications as a functional oxide for applications in photocatalysis and dilute magnetism. Research efforts typically utilize small quantities of synthetic rutile rather than mineral-deposit-derived materials.

== Synthetic rutile ==
Synthetic rutile was first produced in 1948 and is sold under various names. It can be produced from the titanium ore ilmenite through the Becher process. Very pure synthetic rutile is transparent and almost colorless, being slightly yellow in large pieces. Synthetic rutile can be made in a variety of colors by doping. The high refractive index gives an adamantine luster and strong refraction that leads to a diamond-like appearance. The near-colorless diamond substitute is sold as "Titania", which is the old-fashioned chemical name for this oxide. However, rutile is seldom used in jewellery because it is not very hard (scratch-resistant), with a hardness of only about 6 on the Mohs hardness scale.

As the result of growing research interest in the photocatalytic activity of titanium dioxide, in both anatase and rutile phases (as well as biphasic mixtures of the two phases), rutile TiO_{2} in powder and thin film form is frequently fabricated in laboratory conditions through solution based routes using inorganic precursors (typically TiCl_{4}) or organometallic precursors (typically alkoxides such as titanium isopropoxide, also known as TTIP). Depending on synthesis conditions, the first phase to crystallize may be the metastable anatase phase, which can then be converted to the equilibrium rutile phase through thermal treatment. The physical properties of rutile are often modified using dopants to enhance photocatalytic activity by improving photo-generated charge-carrier separation, altering electronic band structures, and improving surface reactivity.

== See also ==
- List of minerals
