= Anti-fog =

Chemicals that prevent the condensation of water as small droplets on a surface

Anti-fog agents, also known as anti-fogging agents and treatments, are chemicals that prevent the condensation of water in the form of small droplets on a surface which resemble fog. They are one of many additives used in the production of plastics.

== Development ==
Anti-fog agents were developed by NASA during the Project Gemini, for use on helmet visors. During Gemini 9A, in June 1966, Astronaut Eugene A. Cernan tested NASA's first space suit, and discovered during the space walk that his helmet visor fogged, among other issues. Cernan's suit was tested using the Spacecraft 9 life support system after the flight, when it was discovered that a small patch of the visor treated with an anti-fog solution remained clear of condensation. Later Gemini flights all included the anti-fog solution, for application prior to the space walk occurring.

== Application ==
Anti-fog agents are available as spray solutions, creams and gels, and wet wipes, while more resistant coatings are often applied during complex manufacturing processes. Anti-fog additives can also be added to plastics where they exude from the inside to the surface.

=== Agents ===
Most commercial anti-fog agents are surfactants that minimize the surface tension of the water. Ethoxylates and polysiloxanes are typical.

Many other substances have been used as anti-fog agents including home-based recipes containing detergents.

One method to prevent fogging is to apply a thin film of detergent, but this method is criticized because detergents are designed to be water-soluble and they cause smearing. Divers often use saliva, which is a commonly known and effective anti-fogging agent.

== Uses ==
=== Underwater diving ===
A demister is a substance applied to transparent surfaces to stop them from becoming fogged with mist deposit, often referred to as fog. Scuba divers often spit into their masks and then wash the surface quickly with water to prevent mist buildup that can impair vision. Several products are commercially available such as Sea Drops that are generally more effective. New masks lenses still have silicone on them from the manufacturing process, so it is recommended to clean the lenses with an appropriate mask scrub, then rinse the mask and then apply a demister solution.

== See also ==
- Fog – Atmospheric phenomenon
- Fogging (photography) – Secondary exposure of undeveloped film to light, for fogging artifacts in photography
