= Tishchenko =

Tishchenko, Tischenko or Tyshchenko (Ukrainian: Тищенко) is a gender-neutral Ukrainian surname that may refer to

- Aleksei Tishchenko (born 1984), Russian boxer
- Alisa Tishchenko (born 2004), Russian rhythmic gymnast
- Anatoly Tishchenko (born 1970), Russian sprint canoer, brother of Olga
- Anatoly Tishchenko Sr. (born 1943), Russian sprint canoer, father of Anatoli and Olga
- Andriy Tishchenko (born 1960), Ukrainian rower
- Artem Tyshchenko (born 1993), Ukrainian biathlete
- Boris Tishchenko (1939–2010), Russian composer and pianist
- Diana Tishchenko (born 1990), Ukrainian classical violinist
- Elizaveta Tishchenko (born 1975), Russian volleyball player
- Evgeny Tishchenko (born 1991), Russian boxer
- Maksim Tishchenko (born 1974), Russian football coach and a former player
- Nikolai Tishchenko (1926–1981), Soviet football player
- Oleksiy Tyshchenko (born 1994), Ukrainian football player
- Olga Tishchenko (born 1973), Russian sprint canoer, sister of Anatoly
- Stanislav Tishchenko (born 1974), Russian football player
- Tatyana Tishchenko (born 1975), Russian sprint canoer
- Vadym Tyshchenko (1963–2015), Ukrainian football player and coach
- Vasili Tishchenko, Moldovan politician
- Viktor Tishchenko (born 1949), Russian football coach and a former player
- Vyacheslav Tishchenko (1861–1941), Russian chemist known for
  - Tishchenko reaction
  - Aldol–Tishchenko reaction
  - Evans–Tishchenko reaction
