= Cannizzaro reaction =

Organic chemical reaction

Named after	Stanislao Cannizzaro
Reaction type	Organic redox reaction

Identifiers
Organic Chemistry Portal	cannizzaro-reaction
RSC ontology ID	RXNO:0000218

The Cannizzaro reaction, named after its discoverer Stanislao Cannizzaro, is a chemical reaction which involves the base-induced disproportionation of two molecules of a non-enolizable aldehyde to give a primary alcohol and a carboxylic acid.

Cannizzaro first accomplished this transformation in 1863, when he obtained benzyl alcohol and potassium benzoate from the treatment of benzaldehyde with potash (potassium carbonate). More typically, the reaction would be conducted with sodium hydroxide or potassium hydroxide, giving the sodium or potassium carboxylate salt of the carboxylic-acid product:

2 C_{6}H_{5}CHO + KOH → C_{6}H_{5}CH_{2}OH + C_{6}H_{5}COOK

The process is a redox reaction involving transfer of a hydride from one substrate molecule to the other: one aldehyde is oxidized to form the acid, the other is reduced to form the alcohol.

== Mechanism ==
Animated reaction mechanism

The reaction involves a nucleophilic acyl substitution on an aldehyde, with the leaving group concurrently attacking another aldehyde in the second step. First, hydroxide attacks a carbonyl. The resulting tetrahedral intermediate then collapses, re-forming the carbonyl and transferring hydride to attack another carbonyl. In the final step of the reaction, the acid and alkoxide ions formed exchange a proton. In the presence of a very high concentration of base, the aldehyde first forms a doubly charged anion from which a hydride ion is transferred to the second molecule of aldehyde to form carboxylate and alkoxide ions. Subsequently, the alkoxide ion acquires a proton from the solvent.

Overall, the reaction follows third-order kinetics. It is second order in aldehyde and first order in base:

rate = k[RCHO]^{2}[OH^{−}]

At very high base a second path (k') becomes important that is second order in base:

rate = k[RCHO]^{2}[OH^{−}] + k'[RCHO]^{2}[OH^{−}]^{2}

The k' pathway implicates a reaction between the doubly charged anion (RCHO_{2}^{2−}) and the aldehyde. The direct transfer of hydride ion is evident from the observation that the recovered alcohol does not contain any deuterium attached to the α-carbon when the reaction is performed in the presence of D_{2}O.

== Scope ==
Due to the strongly alkaline reaction conditions, aldehydes that have alpha hydrogen atom(s) instead undergo deprotonation there, leading to enolates and possible aldol reactions. Under ideal conditions the reaction produces 50% of both the alcohol and the carboxylic acid (it takes two aldehydes to produce one acid and one alcohol). This can be economically viable if the products can be separated and both have a value; the commercial conversion of furfural into furfuryl alcohol and 2-furoic acid is an example of this. Alternatively, higher yields of one product (usually the alcohol) can be achieved in the crossed Cannizzaro reaction, in which a sacrificial aldehyde is used in combination with a more valuable chemical. In this variation, the reductant is formaldehyde, which is oxidized to sodium formate and the other aldehyde chemical is reduced to the alcohol. Thus, the yield of the valuable chemical is high, although the atom economy can be low. The final stage in the synthesis of pentaerythritol is an example.

A solvent-free reaction has been reported involving grinding liquid 2-chlorobenzaldehyde with potassium hydroxide in a mortar and pestle:

Solvent-free Cannizzaro reaction

== Variations ==
In the Tishchenko reaction, the base used is an alkoxide rather than hydroxide, and the product is an ester rather than the separate alcohol and carboxylate groups. After the nucleophilic base attacks an aldehyde, the resulting new oxygen anion attacks another aldehyde to give a hemiacetal linkage between two of the formerly aldehyde-containing reactants rather than undergoing tetrahedral collapse. Eventually tetrahedral collapse does occur, giving the stable ester product.

Certain ketones can undergo a Cannizzaro-type reaction, transferring one of their two carbon groups rather than the hydride that would be present on an aldehyde.

A nitrogen variant was discovered in 2024. In this aza-Cannizzaro reaction, the aldehyde portions of two glyoxylic acid molecules react in an ammonium-rich aqueous solution at neutral pH react and disproportionate to form an amine and an amide. The key hydride-transfer step is thought to occur from the hemiaminal derived from one aldehyde to the iminium derived from the other aldehyde. This specific example is possibly relevant to prebiotic chemistry and chemical ecosystems because the precursors are thought to have existed well before life began and the reaction provides a viable prebiotic pathway for nitrogen incorporation and the synthesis of glycine, a common α-amino acid.

== See also ==
- Formose reaction - slow self-reaction of formaldehyde in hydroxide to form aldose sugars
- Benzoin condensation - self-reaction of aldehydes to give α-hydroxy ketones
- Meerwein–Ponndorf–Verley reduction and Oppenauer oxidation - related interconversions of ketones and secondary alcohols via a similar hydride transfer mechanism
