= Aluminium isopropoxide =

- One enantiomorph of Al_{4}(OiPr)_{12}

Names
- IUPAC name Aluminium Isopropoxide
- Other names Triisopropoxyaluminium; Aluminium isopropanolate Aluminium sec-propanolate Aluminium triisopropoxide 2-Propanol aluminium salt AIP

Identifiers
CAS Number	555-31-7
3D model (JSmol)	Interactive image
Abbreviations	AIP; AlIP (i-PrO)_{3}Al (iPrO)_{3}Al (^{i}PrO)_{3}Al (Me_{2}CHO)_{3}Al
ChemSpider	10670
ECHA InfoCard	100.008.265
EC Number	209-090-8
PubChem CID	11143
RTECS number	BD0975000
UNII	R7486191H8
CompTox Dashboard (EPA)	DTXSID2027202
- InChI: InChI=1S/3C3H7O.Al/c3*1-3(2)4;/h3*3H,1-2H3;/q3*-1;+3 Key: SMZOGRDCAXLAAR-UHFFFAOYSA-N; InChI=1/3C3H7O.Al/c3*1-3(2)4;/h3*3H,1-2H3;/q3*-1;+3 Key: SMZOGRDCAXLAAR-UHFFFAOYAV
- SMILES: CC(C)[O-].CC(C)[O-].CC(C)[O-].[Al+3]

Properties
Chemical formula	C_{9}H_{21}AlO_{3}
Molar mass	204.246 g·mol^{−1}
Appearance	white solid
Density	1.035 g cm^{−3}, solid
Melting point	Sensitive to purity: 138–142 °C (99.99+%); 118 °C (98+%)
Boiling point	@10 Torr 135 °C (408 K)
Solubility in water	Decomposes
Solubility in isopropanol	Poor

Structure
Crystal structure	monoclinic

Hazards
- Occupational safety and health (OHS/OSH)
Main hazards	Flammable (F)
- GHS labelling
Pictograms	(GHS02: Flammable)
Signal word	Warning
Hazard statements	H228
Precautionary statements	P210, P240, P241, P280
NFPA 704 (fire diamond)	2 1 2
Flash point	16 °C (61 °F; 289 K)

Related compounds
Other cations	Titanium isopropoxide
- Except where otherwise noted, data are given for materials in their standard state (at 25 °C [77 °F], 100 kPa). verify (what is ?) Infobox references

Aluminium isopropoxide is the chemical compound usually described with the formula Al(O-i-Pr)_{3}, where i-Pr is the isopropyl group (–CH(CH_{3})_{2}). This colourless solid is a useful reagent in organic synthesis.

== Structure ==
A tetrameric structure of the crystalline material was verified by NMR spectroscopy and X-ray crystallography. The species is described by the formula Al[(μ-O-i-Pr)_{2}Al(O-i-Pr)_{2}]_{3}. The unique central Al is octahedral, and three other Al centers adopt tetrahedral geometry. The idealised point group symmetry is D_{3}.

== Preparation ==
This compound is commercially available. Industrially, it is prepared by the reaction between isopropyl alcohol and aluminium, or aluminium trichloride:

2 Al + 6 iPrOH → 2 Al(O–i–Pr)_{3} + 3 H_{2}
AlCl_{3} + 3 iPrOH → Al(O–i–Pr)_{3} + 3 HCl

The procedure entails heating a mixture of aluminium, isopropyl alcohol, with a small amount of mercuric chloride. The process occurs via the formation of an amalgam of the aluminium. A catalytic amount of iodine is sometimes added to initiate the reaction. The industrial route does not use mercury.

== Reactions ==
Aluminium isopropoxide is used in MPV reductions of ketones and aldehydes and the Oppenauer oxidation of secondary alcohols. In these reactions, it is assumed that the tetrameric cluster disaggregates. It is used in the Tishchenko reaction.

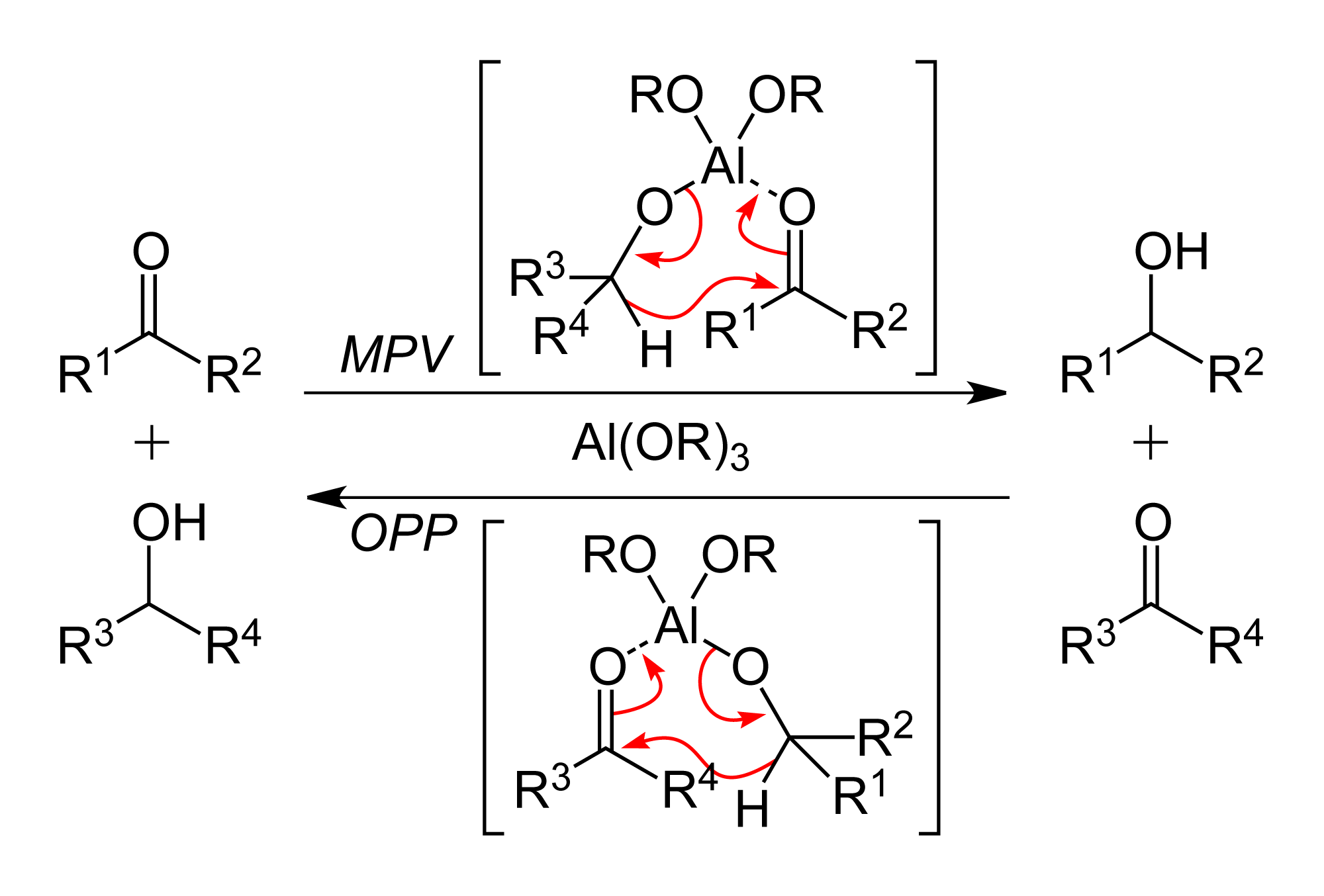

Being a basic alkoxide, Al(O-i-Pr)_{3} has been also investigated as a catalyst for ring opening polymerization of cyclic esters.

== History ==
Aluminium isopropoxide was first reported in the master's thesis of the Russian organic chemist Vyacheslav Tishchenko (Вячеслав Евгеньевич Тищенко, 1861–1941), which was reprinted in the Journal of the Russian Physico-Chemical Society (Журнал Русского Физико-Химического Общества) of 1899. This contribution included a detailed description of its synthesis, its peculiar physico-chemical behavior, and its catalytic activity in the Tishchenko reaction (catalytic transformation of aldehydes into esters). It was later found also to display catalytic activity as a reducing agent by Meerwein and Schmidt in the Meerwein–Ponndorf–Verley reduction ("MPV") in 1925. The reverse of the MPV reaction, oxidation of an alcohol to a ketone, is termed the Oppenauer oxidation. The original Oppenauer oxidation employed aluminium butoxide in place of the isopropoxide.

== Related compounds ==
- Aluminium phenolate
- Aluminium tert-butoxide, which is a dimer [(t-Bu-O)_{2}Al(μ-O-t-Bu)]_{2}. It is prepared analogously to the isopropoxide.
