= Isopropyl alcohol =

Simplest secondary alcohol

Skeletal formula of isopropyl alcohol
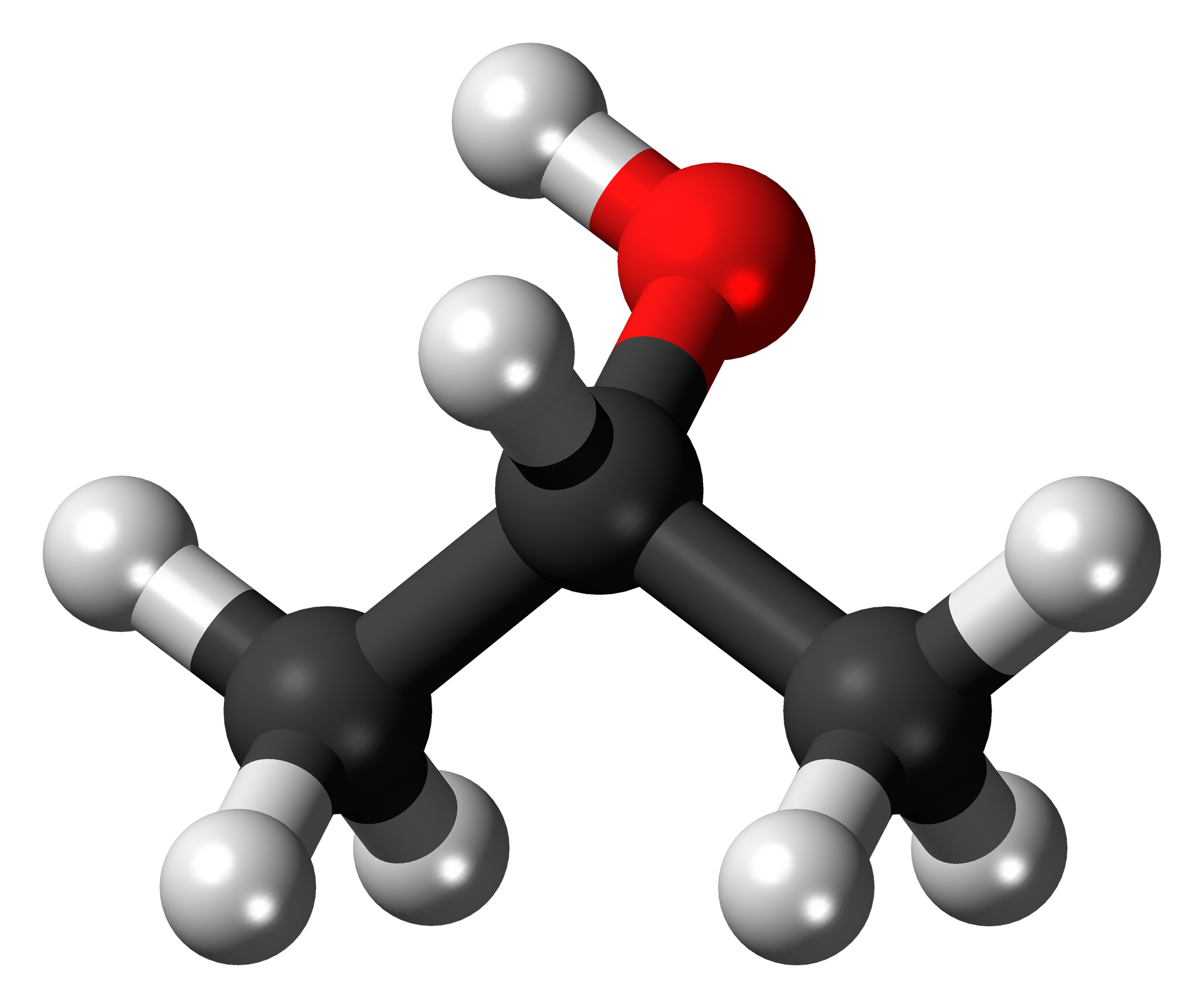
Ball-and-stick model of isopropyl alcohol
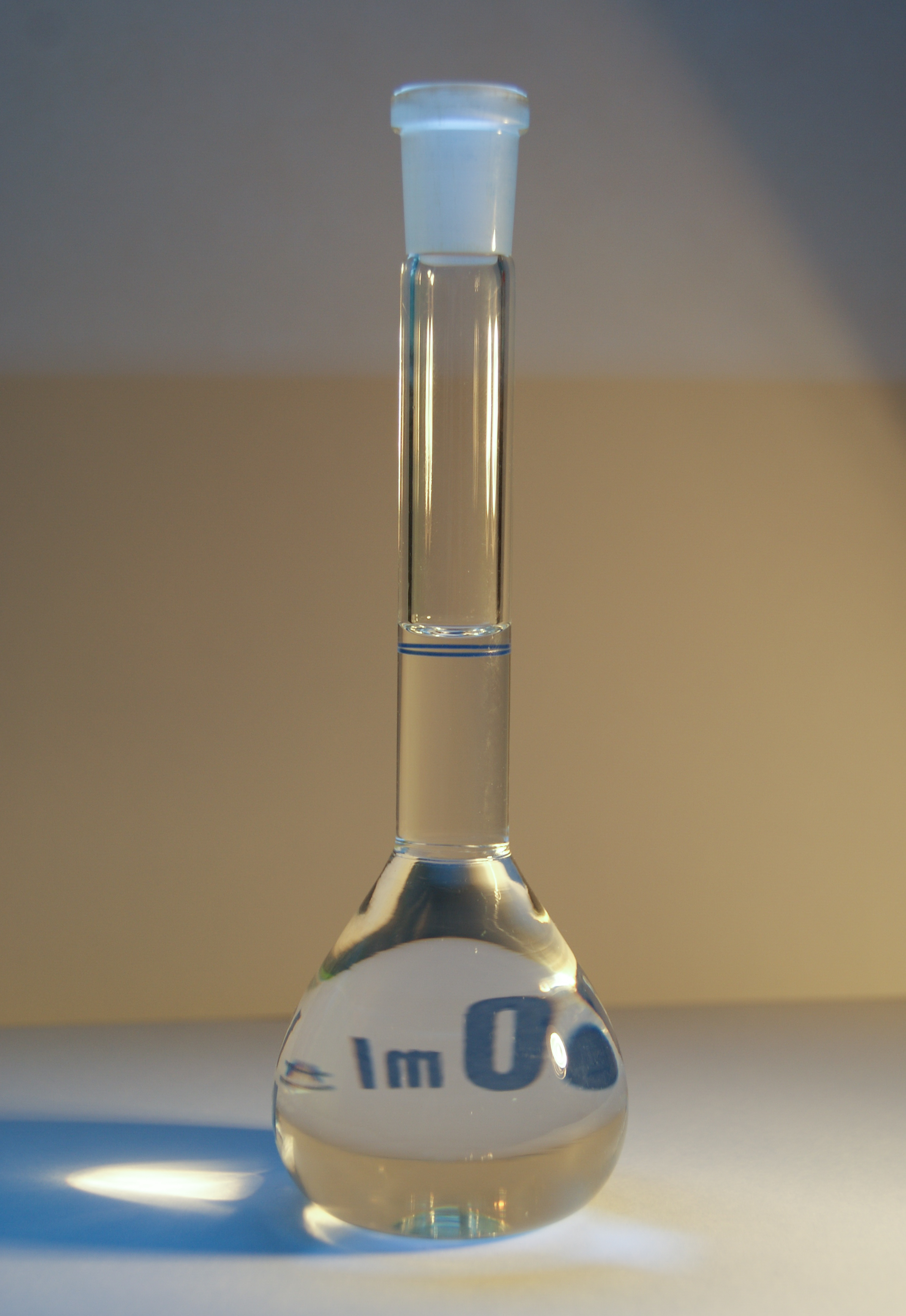

Names
- Preferred IUPAC name Propan-2-ol
- Other names 2-Propanol; Isopropanol; Rubbing alcohol sec-Propyl alcohol 2-Hydroxypropane; Dimethyl carbinol

Identifiers
CAS Number	67-63-0
3D model (JSmol)	Interactive image
Abbreviations	IPA; Me_{2}CHOH i-PrOH iPrOH^{i}PrOH
Beilstein Reference	635639
ChEBI	CHEBI:17824
ChEMBL	ChEMBL582
ChemSpider	3644
ECHA InfoCard	100.000.601
Gmelin Reference	1464
KEGG	D00137
PubChem CID	3776
RTECS number	NT8050000
UNII	ND2M416302
UN number	1219
CompTox Dashboard (EPA)	DTXSID7020762
- InChI: InChI=1S/C3H7OH/c1-3(2)4/h3-4H,1-2H3 Key: KFZMGEQAYNKOFK-UHFFFAOYSA-N
- SMILES: CC(O)C

Properties
Chemical formula	C_{3}H_{8}O
Molar mass	60.096 g·mol^{−1}
Appearance	Colorless liquid
Odor	Pungent alcoholic odor
Density	0.786 g/cm^{3} (20 °C)
Melting point	−89 °C (−128 °F; 184 K)
Boiling point	82.6 °C (180.7 °F; 355.8 K)
Critical point (T, P)	508.7 K (235.6 °C), 5370 kPa
Solubility in water	Miscible
Solubility	Miscible with benzene, chloroform, ethanol, diethyl ether, glycerol; soluble in acetone
log P	−0.16
Acidity (pK_{a})	16.5
Magnetic susceptibility (χ)	−45.794·10^{−6} cm^{3}/mol
Refractive index (n_{D})	1.3776
Viscosity	2.86 cP at 15 °C; 1.96 cP at 25 °C; 1.77 cP at 30 °C
Dipole moment	1.66 D (gas)

Thermochemistry
Heat capacity (C)	2.68 J/(gK) at 20°C-25°C
Std molar entropy (S^{⦵}_{298})	180 J/(mol K)
Std enthalpy of formation (Δ_{f}H^{⦵}_{298})	−318.2 kJ/mol
Enthalpy of fusion (Δ_{f}H^{⦵}_{fus})	5.28 kJ/mol
Enthalpy of vaporization (Δ_{f}H_{vap})	44.0 kJ/mol

Pharmacology
ATC code	D08AX05 (WHO)

Hazards
- Occupational safety and health (OHS/OSH)
Main hazards	Flammable, mildly toxic
- GHS labelling
Pictograms	(GHS07: Exclamation mark) (GHS02: Flammable)
Signal word	Danger
Hazard statements	H225, H302, H319, H336
Precautionary statements	P210, P261, P305+P351+P338
NFPA 704 (fire diamond)	1 3 0
Flash point	Open cup: 11.7 °C (53.1 °F; 284.8 K); Closed cup: 13 °C (55 °F)
Autoignition temperature	399 °C (750 °F; 672 K)
Explosive limits	2–12.7%
Threshold limit value (TLV)	980 mg/m^{3} (TWA), 1225 mg/m^{3} (STEL)
- Lethal dose or concentration (LD, LC)
LD_{50} (median dose)	12800 mg/kg (dermal, rabbit); 3600 mg/kg (oral, mouse); 5000 mg/kg (oral, rat); 2364 mg/kg (oral, rabbit)
LC_{50} (median concentration)	53,000 mg/m^{3} (inhalation, mouse); 12,000 ppm (rat, 8 h)
LC_{Lo} (lowest published)	16,000 ppm (rat, 4 h); 12,800 ppm (mouse, 3 h)
- NIOSH (US health exposure limits)
PEL (Permissible)	TWA 400 ppm (980 mg/m^{3})
REL (Recommended)	TWA 400 ppm (980 mg/m^{3}), ST 500 ppm (1225 mg/m^{3})
IDLH (Immediate danger)	2000 ppm
- Safety data sheet (SDS)

Related compounds
Related alcohols	1-Propanol, ethanol, 2-butanol
Related compounds	Acetone

Supplementary data page
- Isopropyl alcohol (data page)
- Except where otherwise noted, data are given for materials in their standard state (at 25 °C [77 °F], 100 kPa). verify (what is ?) Infobox references

Isopropyl alcohol (IUPAC name propan-2-ol and also called isopropanol or 2-propanol, commonly abbreviated as IPA) is a colorless, flammable, organic compound with a pungent odor.

Isopropyl alcohol, an organic polar molecule, is miscible in water, ethanol, and chloroform, demonstrating its ability to dissolve a wide range of substances including ethyl cellulose, polyvinyl butyral, oils, alkaloids, and natural resins. Notably, it is not miscible with salt solutions and can be separated by adding sodium chloride in a process known as salting out. It forms an azeotrope with water, resulting in a boiling point of 80.37 °C and is characterized by its slightly bitter taste. Isopropyl alcohol becomes viscous at lower temperatures, freezing at −89.5 °C, and has significant ultraviolet-visible absorbance at 205 nm. Chemically, it can be oxidized to acetone or undergo various reactions to form compounds such as isopropoxides, e.g. aluminium isopropoxide. As an isopropyl group linked to a hydroxyl group (chemical formula (CH_{3})_{2}CHOH) it is the simplest example of a secondary alcohol, where the alcohol carbon atom is attached to two other carbon atoms. It is a structural isomer of propan-1-ol and ethyl methyl ether, all of which share the formula C_{3}H_{8}O.

It was first synthesized in 1853 by Alexander William Williamson and later produced for cordite preparation. It is produced through hydration of propene or hydrogenation of acetone, with modern processes achieving anhydrous alcohol through azeotropic distillation.

Isopropyl alcohol serves in medical settings as a rubbing alcohol and hand sanitizer, and in industrial and household applications as a solvent. It is a common ingredient in products such as antiseptics, disinfectants, and detergents. More than a million tonnes are produced worldwide annually. Isopropyl alcohol poses safety risks due to its flammability and potential for peroxide formation. Its ingestion or absorption leads to toxic effects including central nervous system depression and coma.

== Properties ==
Isopropyl alcohol is miscible in water, ethanol, and chloroform, as it is an organic polar molecule. It dissolves ethyl cellulose, polyvinyl butyral, many oils, alkaloids, and natural resins. Unlike ethanol or methanol, isopropyl alcohol is not miscible with salt solutions and can be separated from aqueous solutions by adding a salt such as sodium chloride. The process is colloquially called salting out, and causes concentrated isopropyl alcohol to separate into a distinct layer.

Isopropyl alcohol forms an azeotrope with water, which gives a boiling point of 80.37 °C (176.67 °F) and a composition of 87.7% by mass (91% by volume) isopropyl alcohol. It has a slightly bitter taste, and is toxic when ingested.

Isopropyl alcohol becomes increasingly viscous with decreasing temperature and freezes at −89.5 °C (−129.1 °F). Mixtures with water have higher freezing points: 99% at −89.5 °C (−129.1 °F), 91% (the azeotrope) at −75.5 °C (−103.9 °F), and 70% at −61.7 °C (−79.1 °F).

Isopropyl alcohol has a maximal absorbance at 205 nm in an ultraviolet-visible spectrum.

== Reactions ==
Isopropyl alcohol can be oxidized to acetone, which is the corresponding ketone. This can be achieved using oxidizing agents such as chromic acid, or by dehydrogenation of isopropyl alcohol over a heated copper catalyst:

(CH_{3})_{2}CHOH → (CH_{3})_{2}CO + H_{2}

Isopropyl alcohol is often used as both solvent and hydride source in the Meerwein-Ponndorf-Verley reduction and other transfer hydrogenation reactions. Isopropyl alcohol may be converted to 2-bromopropane using phosphorus tribromide, or dehydrated to propene by heating with sulfuric acid.

Like most alcohols, isopropyl alcohol reacts with active metals such as potassium to form alkoxides that are called isopropoxides. With titanium tetrachloride, isopropyl alcohol reacts to give titanium isopropoxide:

TiCl_{4} + 4 (CH_{3})_{2}CHOH → Ti(OCH(CH_{3})_{2})_{4} + 4 HCl

This and similar reactions are often conducted in the presence of base.

The reaction with aluminium is initiated by a trace of mercury to give aluminium isopropoxide.

== History ==
Isopropyl alcohol was first synthesized by the chemist Alexander William Williamson in 1853. He achieved this by heating a mixture of propene and sulfuric acid. Standard Oil produced isopropyl alcohol by hydrating propene. Isopropyl alcohol was oxidized to acetone for the preparation of cordite, a smokeless, low explosive propellant.

== Production ==
In 1994, 1.5 million tonnes of isopropyl alcohol were produced in the United States, Europe, and Japan. It is primarily produced by combining water and propene in a hydration reaction or by hydrogenating acetone. There are two routes for the hydration process and both processes require that the isopropyl alcohol be separated from water and other by-products by distillation. Isopropyl alcohol and water form an azeotrope, and simple distillation gives a material that is 87.9% by mass isopropyl alcohol and 12.1% by mass water. Pure (anhydrous) isopropyl alcohol is made by azeotropic distillation of the wet isopropyl alcohol using either diisopropyl ether or cyclohexane as azeotroping agents.

=== Biological ===
Small amounts of isopropyl alcohol are produced in the body in diabetic ketoacidosis.

=== Indirect hydration ===
Indirect hydration reacts propene with sulfuric acid to form a mixture of sulfate esters. This process can use low-quality propene, and is predominant in the USA. These processes give primarily isopropyl alcohol rather than 1-propanol, because adding water or sulfuric acid to propene follows Markovnikov's rule. Subsequent hydrolysis of these esters by steam produces isopropyl alcohol, by distillation. Diisopropyl ether is a significant by-product of this process; it is recycled back to the process and hydrolyzed to give the desired product.

CH_{3}CH=CH_{2} + H_{2}O (CH_{3})_{2}CHOH

=== Direct hydration ===
Direct hydration reacts propene and water, either in gas or liquid phase, at high pressures in the presence of solid or supported acidic catalysts. This type of process usually requires higher-purity propylene (> 90%). Direct hydration is more commonly used in Europe.

=== Hydrogenation of acetone ===
Isopropyl alcohol can be prepared via the hydrogenation of acetone, but this approach involves an extra step compared to the above methods, as acetone is itself normally prepared from propene via the cumene process. IPA cost is primarily driven by raw material cost, and this way is economical when acetone is cheaper than propylene as a byproduct of phenol production (the coexistence of two ways on most markets allows them to balance the prices).

A known issue is the formation of MIBK and other self-condensation products. Raney nickel was one of the original industrial catalysts, modern catalysts are often supported bimetallic materials.

== Uses ==
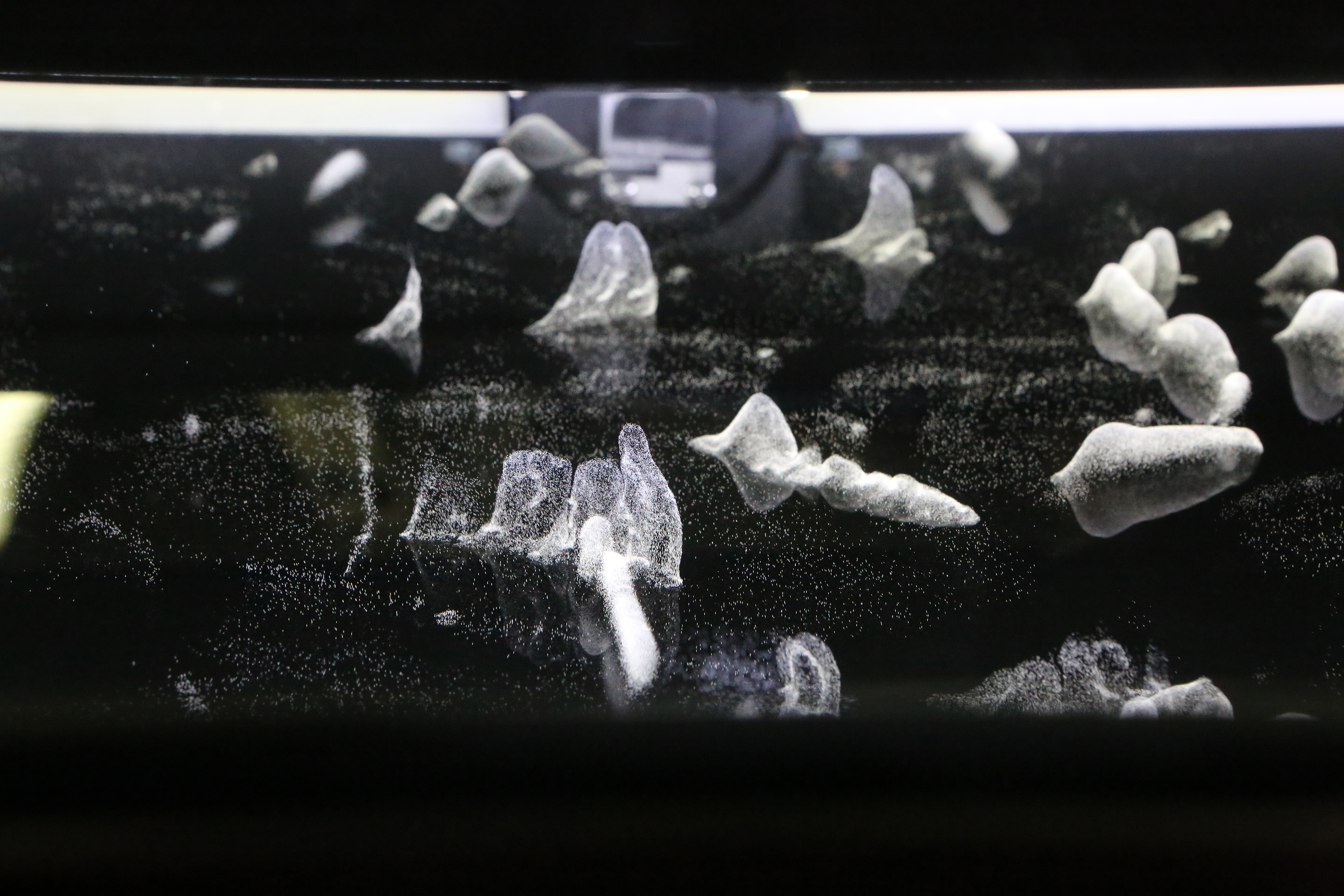
One of the small scale uses of isopropyl alcohol is in cloud chambers. Isopropyl alcohol has ideal physical and chemical properties to form a supersaturated layer of vapor which can be condensed by particles of radiation.

In 1990, 45,000 metric tonnes of isopropyl alcohol were used in the United States, mostly as a solvent for coatings or for industrial processes. In that year, 5400 metric tonnes were used for household purposes and in personal care products. Isopropyl alcohol is popular in particular for pharmaceutical applications, due to its low toxicity. Some isopropyl alcohol is used as a chemical intermediate. Isopropyl alcohol may be converted to acetone, but the cumene process is more significant.

=== Solvent ===
Isopropyl alcohol dissolves a wide range of non-polar compounds. It evaporates quickly and the typically available grades tend not to leave behind oil traces when used as a cleaning fluid unlike some other common solvents. It is also relatively non-toxic. Thus, it is used widely as a solvent and as a cleaning fluid, especially where there are oils or oil based residues which are not easily cleaned with water, conveniently evaporating and (depending on water content and other variables) posing less of a risk of corrosion or rusting than plain water. Together with ethanol, n-butanol, and methanol, it belongs to the group of alcohol solvents.

Isopropyl alcohol is commonly used for cleaning eyeglasses, electrical contacts, audio or video tape heads, DVD and other optical disc lenses, bongs, and for removing thermal paste from heatsinks on CPUs and other IC packages.

It is sometimes used by miniatures hobbyists to strip acrylic paints & primers from high impact polystyrene miniatures.

=== Intermediate ===
Isopropyl alcohol is esterified to give isopropyl acetate, another solvent. It reacts with carbon disulfide and sodium hydroxide to give sodium isopropylxanthate, which has use as an herbicide and an ore flotation reagent. Isopropyl alcohol reacts with titanium tetrachloride and aluminium metal to give titanium and aluminium isopropoxides, respectively, the former a catalyst, and the latter a chemical reagent. This compound may serve as a chemical reagent in itself, by acting as a dihydrogen donor in transfer hydrogenation.

=== Medical ===
Rubbing alcohol, hand sanitizer, and disinfecting pads typically contain a 60–70% solution of isopropyl alcohol or ethanol in water. Water is required to open up membrane pores of bacteria, which acts as a gateway for isopropyl alcohol. A 75% v/v solution in water may be used as a hand sanitizer. Isopropyl alcohol is used as a water-drying aid for the prevention of otitis externa, better known as swimmer's ear.

Inhaled isopropyl alcohol can be used for treating nausea in some settings by placing a disinfecting pad under the nose.

=== Early uses as an anesthetic ===
Although isopropyl alcohol can be used for anesthesia, its many negative attributes or drawbacks prohibit this use. Isopropyl alcohol can also be used similarly to ether as a solvent or as an anesthetic by inhaling the fumes or orally. Early uses included using the solvent as general anesthetic for small mammals and rodents by scientists and some veterinarians. However, it was soon discontinued, as many complications arose, including respiratory irritation, internal bleeding, and visual and hearing problems. In rare cases, respiratory failure leading to death in animals was observed.

=== Automotive ===
Isopropyl alcohol is a major ingredient in "gas dryer" fuel additives. In significant quantities, water is a problem in fuel tanks, as it separates from gasoline and can freeze in the supply lines at low temperatures. Alcohol does not remove water from gasoline, but the alcohol solubilizes water in gasoline. Once soluble, water does not pose the same risk as insoluble water, as it no longer accumulates in the supply lines and freezes but is dissolved within the fuel itself. Isopropyl alcohol is often sold in aerosol cans as a windshield or door lock deicer. Isopropyl alcohol is also used to remove brake fluid traces from hydraulic braking systems, so that the brake fluid (usually DOT 3, DOT 4, or mineral oil) does not contaminate the brake pads and cause poor braking. Mixtures of isopropyl alcohol and water are also commonly used in homemade windshield washer fluid.

=== Laboratory ===
As a biological specimen preservative, isopropyl alcohol provides a comparatively non-toxic alternative to formaldehyde and other synthetic preservatives. Isopropyl alcohol solutions of 70–99% are used to preserve specimens.

Isopropyl alcohol is often used in DNA extraction. A lab worker adds it to a DNA solution to precipitate the DNA, which then forms a pellet after centrifugation. This is possible because DNA is insoluble in isopropyl alcohol.

=== Semiconductors ===
Isopropyl alcohol is used as an additive in alkaline anisotropic etching of monocrystalline silicon, such as with potassium hydroxide or tetramethylammonium hydroxide. This process is used in texturing of silicon solar cells and microfabrication (e.g. in MEMS devices). Isopropyl alcohol increases the anisotropy of the etch by increasing the etch rate of [100] plane relative to higher indexed planes.

== Safety ==
Isopropyl alcohol vapor is denser than air and is flammable, with a flammability range of between 2% and 12.7% in air. It should be kept away from heat, sparks, and open flame. Distillation of isopropyl alcohol over magnesium has been reported to form peroxides, which may explode upon concentration. Isopropyl alcohol can react with air and oxygen over time to form unstable peroxides that can explode.

== Toxicology ==
Isopropyl alcohol, via its metabolites, is somewhat more toxic than ethanol, but considerably less toxic than ethylene glycol or methanol. Death from ingestion or absorption of even relatively large quantities is rare. Both isopropyl alcohol and its metabolite, acetone, act as central nervous system (CNS) depressants. Poisoning can occur from ingestion, inhalation, or skin absorption. Symptoms of isopropyl alcohol poisoning include flushing, headache, dizziness, CNS depression, nausea, vomiting, anesthesia, hypothermia, low blood pressure, shock, respiratory depression, and coma. Overdoses may cause a fruity odor on the breath as a result of its metabolism to acetone. Isopropyl alcohol does not cause an anion gap acidosis, but it produces an osmolal gap between the calculated and measured osmolalities of serum, as do the other alcohols. The findings of acetone without acidosis leads to the sine qua non of "ketosis without acidosis."

Isopropyl alcohol is oxidized to form acetone by alcohol dehydrogenase in the liver and has a biological half-life in humans between 2.5 and 8.0 hours. Unlike methanol or ethylene glycol poisoning, the metabolites of isopropyl alcohol are considerably less toxic, and treatment is largely supportive. Furthermore, there is no indication for the use of fomepizole, an alcohol dehydrogenase inhibitor, unless co-ingestion with methanol or ethylene glycol is suspected.

In forensic pathology, people who have died as a result of diabetic ketoacidosis or alcoholic ketoacidosis, with no isopropyl alcohol ingestion, usually have detectable blood concentrations of isopropyl alcohol of 1 to 40 mg/dL, while those by fatal isopropyl alcohol ingestion usually have blood concentrations of hundreds of mg/dL.
