= Titanium butoxide =

- gas phase structure

Names
- IUPAC name Titanium(IV) butoxide
- Other names Titanium(IV) butoxide, titanium n-butoxide, titanium tetrakis(butoxide), butyl titanate, tetrabutoxy titanium, titanium tetrabutoxide, tetrabutoxytitanium, tetrabutyltitanate, tetrabutyl orthotitanate, titanium tetrabutanolate, TYZOR TBT

Identifiers
CAS Number	5593-70-4
3D model (JSmol)	Interactive image
ChemSpider	13836735
ECHA InfoCard	100.024.552
EC Number	227-006-8
PubChem CID	21801
UNII	FJS8Q2MX9I
UN number	2920
CompTox Dashboard (EPA)	DTXSID6041262
- InChI: InChI=1S/4C4H9O.Ti/c4*1-2-3-4-5;/h4*2-4H2,1H3;/q4*-1;+4 Key: YHWCPXVTRSHPNY-UHFFFAOYSA-N
- SMILES: CCCC[O-].CCCC[O-].CCCC[O-].CCCC[O-].[Ti+4]

Properties
Chemical formula	C_{16}H_{36}O_{4}Ti
Molar mass	340.32164
Appearance	COLORLESS TO LIGHT-YELLOW LIQUID
Odor	weak alcohol-like
Density	0.998 g/cm^{3}
Melting point	−55 °C (−67 °F; 218 K)
Boiling point	312 °C (594 °F; 585 K)
Solubility in water	decomposes
Solubility	most organic solvents except ketones
Refractive index (n_{D})	1.486

Thermochemistry
Heat capacity (C)	711 J/(mol·K)
Std enthalpy of formation (Δ_{f}H^{⦵}_{298})	−1670 kJ/mol

Hazards
- Lethal dose or concentration (LD, LC)
LD_{50} (median dose)	3122 mg/kg (rat, oral) and 180 mg/kg (mouse, intravenal).
- Except where otherwise noted, data are given for materials in their standard state (at 25 °C [77 °F], 100 kPa). Infobox references

Titanium butoxide is a metal alkoxide with the formula Ti(OBu)_{4} (Bu = –CH_{2}CH_{2}CH_{2}CH_{3}). It is a colorless odorless liquid although aged samples can appear yellowish. Owing to hydrolysis, samples have a weak alcohol-like odor. It is soluble in many organic solvents. Decomposition in water is not hazardous, and therefore titanium butoxide is often used as a liquid source of titanium dioxide, which allows deposition of TiO_{2} coatings of various shapes and sizes down to the nanoscale.

Titanium butoxide is often used to prepare titanium oxide materials and catalysts.

== Structure and synthesis ==
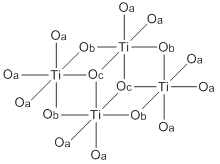
Structure of a typical titanium alkoxide, e.g. titanium ethoxide (organic substituents removed for clarity).

Like most titanium alkoxides (exception: titanium isopropoxide), Ti(OBu)_{4} is not a monomer but exists as a cluster (see titanium ethoxide). Nonetheless it is often depicted as a simple monomer.

It is produced by treating titanium tetrachloride with butanol:

TiCl_{4} + 4 HOBu → Ti(OBu)_{4} + 4 HCl

The reaction requires base to proceed to completion.

== Reactions ==
Like other titanium alkoxides, titanium butoxide exchanges alkoxide groups:

Ti(OBu)_{4} + HOR → Ti(OBu)_{3}(OR) + HOBu
Ti(OBu)_{3}(OR) + HOR → Ti(OBu)_{2}(OR)_{2} + HOBu

etc. For this reason, titanium butoxide is not compatible with alcohol solvents.

Analogous to the alkoxide exchange, titanium butoxide hydrolyzes readily. The reaction details are complex, but the overall process can be summarized with this balanced equation.

Ti(OBu)_{4} + 2 H_{2}O → TiO_{2} + 4 HOBu

Diverse oxo-alkoxo intermediates have been trapped and characterized. Pyrolysis also affords the dioxide:

Ti(OBu)_{4} → TiO_{2} + 2 Bu_{2}O

Titanium butoxide reacts with alkylcyclosiloxanes. With ocatamethylcyclotetrasiloxane it produces dibutoxydimethylsilane, 1,5-dibutoxyhexamethyltrisiloxane, 1,7-dibutoxyoctamethyltetrasiloxane, 1,3-dibutoxytetramethyldisiloxane and polymers. With hexamethylcyclotrisiloxane it also produces dibutoxydimethylsilane.

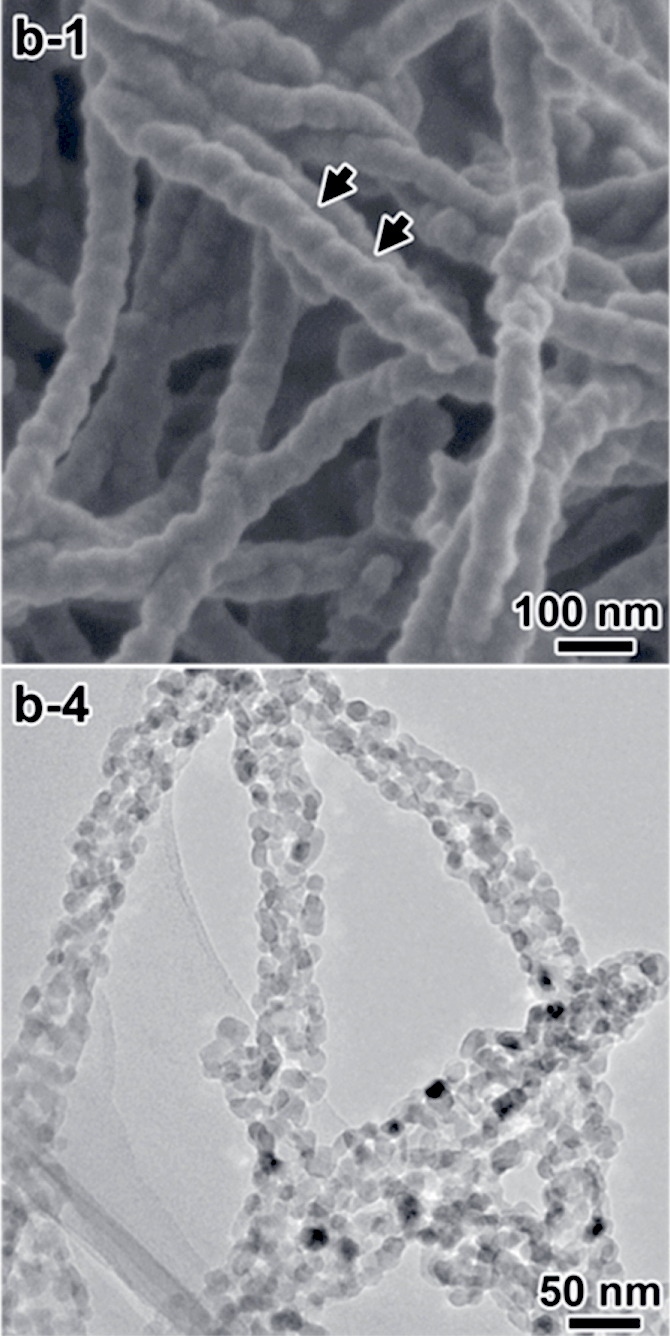
leftSEM (top) and TEM (bottom) images of chiral TiO_{2} nanofibers produced by depositing titanium butoxide on carbon nanofibers. Carbon was removed by heating in air.

== Safety ==
LD50 is 3122 mg/kg (rat, oral) and 180 mg/kg (mouse, intravenal).

Titanium butoxide is a corrosive, flammable liquid which reacts violently with oxidizing materials. It is incompatible with sulfuric and nitric acids, inorganic hydroxides and peroxides, bases, amines, amides, isocyanates and boranes. It is irritating to skin and eyes, and causes nausea and vomiting if swallowed. LD50 is 3122 mg/kg (rat, oral) and 180 mg/kg (mouse, intravenal); flash point is 77 °C. When heated it emits irritating fumes, which form explosive mixtures with air at concentrations above 2 vol%.
