= Titanium tetralactate =

Names
- Other names titanium lactate, titanium(IV) lactate

Identifiers
CAS Number	79533-80-5
3D model (JSmol)	Interactive image
ChemSpider	141515
EC Number	238-882-6
PubChem CID	161092
UNII	L8G2JY5O7S
CompTox Dashboard (EPA)	DTXSID70328142 DTXSID50933314, DTXSID70328142
- InChI: InChI=1S/4C3H6O3.Ti/c4*1-2(4)3(5)6;/h4*2,4H,1H3,(H,5,6);/q;;;;+4/p-4 Key: AIFLGMNWQFPTAJ-UHFFFAOYSA-J
- SMILES: CC(C(=O)[O-])O.CC(C(=O)[O-])O.CC(C(=O)[O-])O.CC(C(=O)[O-])O.[Ti+4]

Properties
Chemical formula	C_{12}H_{20}O_{12}Ti
Molar mass	404.04 g/mol
Solubility in water	Soluble
- Except where otherwise noted, data are given for materials in their standard state (at 25 °C [77 °F], 100 kPa). Infobox references

Titanium lactate is a chemical compound, a salt of titanium and lactic acid with the formula C_{12}H_{20}O_{12}Ti.

== Synthesis ==
A reaction of lactic acid with tetraisopropyl titanate in distilled water.

== Uses ==
The compound was used as a mordant in leather industry under the trade name of corrichrome.
