= Titanium isopropoxide =

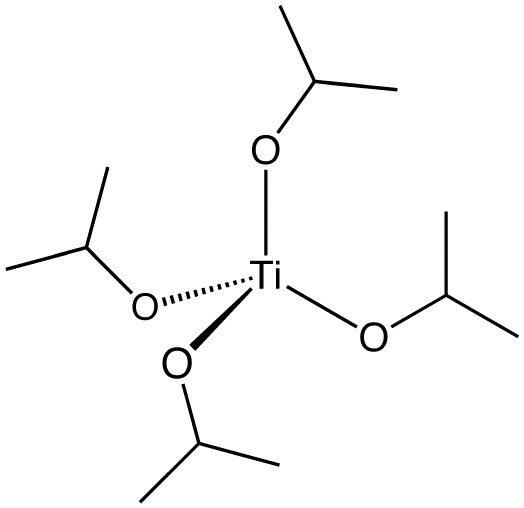

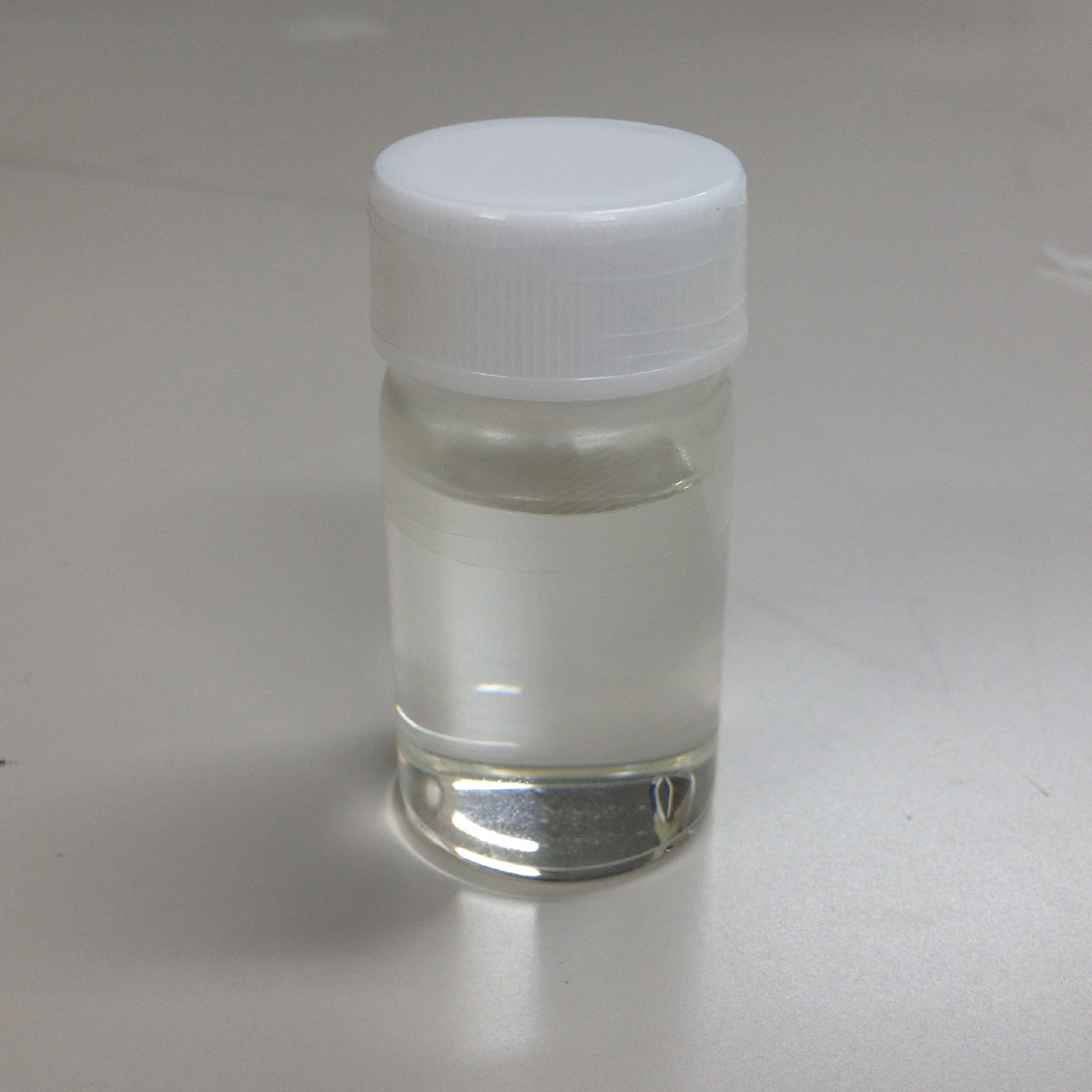

Names
- IUPAC name Titanium(IV) isopropoxide
- Systematic IUPAC name Titanium(IV) tetra(propan-2-olate)
- Other names Tetraisopropyl titanate Titanium(IV) i-propoxide Titanium tetraisopropoxide Tetraisopropyl orthotitanate

Identifiers
CAS Number	546-68-9
3D model (JSmol)	Interactive image
ChEBI	CHEBI:139496
ChemSpider	21106214
ECHA InfoCard	100.008.100
EC Number	208-909-6
PubChem CID	11026
UNII	76NX7K235Y
UN number	1993
CompTox Dashboard (EPA)	DTXSID5027196
- InChI: Key: VXUYXOFXAQZZMF-UHFFFAOYSA-N; InChI=1S/4C3H7O.Ti/c4*1-3(2)4;/h4*3H,1-2H3;/q4*-1;+4
- SMILES: CC(C)O[Ti](OC(C)C)(OC(C)C)OC(C)C

Properties
Chemical formula	C_{12}H_{28}O_{4}Ti
Molar mass	284.219 g·mol^{−1}
Appearance	colorless to light-yellow liquid
Density	0.96 g/cm^{3}
Melting point	17 °C (63 °F; 290 K) approximation
Boiling point	232 °C (450 °F; 505 K)
Solubility in water	Reacts to form TiO_{2}
Solubility	soluble in ethanol, ether, benzene, chloroform
Refractive index (n_{D})	1.46

Hazards
- GHS labelling
Pictograms	(GHS02: Flammable) (GHS05: Corrosive) (GHS07: Exclamation mark)
Signal word	Danger
Hazard statements	H226, H318, H319, H336
Precautionary statements	P210, P233, P240, P241, P242, P243, P261, P264, P271, P280, P303+P361+P353, P304+P340, P305+P351+P338, P310, P312, P337+P313, P370+P378, P403+P233, P403+P235, P405, P501
- Lethal dose or concentration (LD, LC)
LD_{50} (median dose)	7600 mg/kg (rat, oral)

Related compounds
Other anions	Titanium methoxide; Titanium ethoxide; Titanium butoxide
Other cations	Aluminium isopropoxide
- Except where otherwise noted, data are given for materials in their standard state (at 25 °C [77 °F], 100 kPa). verify (what is ?) Infobox references

Titanium isopropoxide, also commonly referred to as titanium tetraisopropoxide or TTIP, is a chemical compound with the formula Ti{OCH(CH_{3})_{2}}_{4}. This alkoxide of titanium(IV) is used in organic synthesis and materials science. It is a diamagnetic tetrahedral molecule. Titanium isopropoxide is a component of the Sharpless epoxidation, a method for the synthesis of chiral epoxides.

The structures of the titanium alkoxides are often complex. Crystalline titanium methoxide is tetrameric with the molecular formula Ti_{4}(OCH_{3})_{16}. Alkoxides derived from bulkier alcohols such as isopropyl alcohol aggregate less. Titanium isopropoxide is mainly a monomer in nonpolar solvents.

== Preparation ==
It is prepared by treating titanium tetrachloride with isopropanol in presence of ammonia. Hydrogen chloride is formed as a coproduct:

TiCl_{4} + 4 (CH_{3})_{2}CHOH → Ti{OCH(CH_{3})_{2}}_{4} + 4 HCl

== Properties ==
Titanium isopropoxide reacts with water to deposit titanium dioxide:

Ti{OCH(CH_{3})_{2}}_{4} + 2 H_{2}O → TiO_{2} + 4 (CH_{3})_{2}CHOH

This reaction is employed in the sol-gel synthesis of TiO_{2}-based materials in the form of powders or thin films. Typically water is added in excess to a solution of the alkoxide in an alcohol. The composition, crystallinity and morphology of the inorganic product are determined by the presence of additives (e.g. acetic acid), the amount of water (hydrolysis ratio), and reaction conditions.

The compound is also used as a catalyst in the preparation of certain cyclopropanes in the Kulinkovich reaction. Prochiral thioethers are oxidized enantioselectively using a catalyst derived from Ti(O-i-Pr)_{4}.

== Naming ==
Titanium(IV) isopropoxide is a widely used item of commerce and has acquired many names in addition to those listed in the table. A sampling of the names include: titanium(IV) i-propoxide, isopropyl titanate, tetraisopropyl titanate, tetraisopropyl orthotitanate, titanium tetraisopropylate, orthotitanic acid tetraisopropyl ester, Isopropyl titanate(IV), titanic acid tetraisopropyl ester, isopropyltitanate, titanium(IV) isopropoxide, titanium tetraisopropoxide, iso-propyl titanate, titanium tetraisopropanolate, tetraisopropoxytitanium(IV), tetraisopropanolatotitanium, tetrakis(isopropoxy) titanium, tetrakis(isopropanolato) titanium, titanic acid isopropyl ester, titanic acid tetraisopropyl ester, titanium isopropoxide, titanium isopropylate, tetrakis(1-methylethoxy)titanium.

== Applications ==
TTIP can be used as a precursor for ambient conditions vapour phase deposition such as infiltration into polymer thin films.
