= Aluminium ethoxide =

Names
- Other names Aluminium ethoxide Triethoxyaluminum

Identifiers
CAS Number	555-75-9
3D model (JSmol)	Interactive image
ChemSpider	21171290
ECHA InfoCard	100.008.279
PubChem CID	16685041
UNII	S34F5V33DX
CompTox Dashboard (EPA)	DTXSID7027203
- InChI: InChI=1S/3C2H5O.Al/c3*1-2-3;/h3*2H2,1H3;/q3*-1;+3 Key: JPUHCPXFQIXLMW-UHFFFAOYSA-N; InChI=1/3C2H5O.Al/c3*1-2-3;/h3*2H2,1H3;/q3*-1;+3/rC6H15AlO3/c1-4-8-7(9-5-2)10-6-3/h4-6H2,1-3H3 Key: JPUHCPXFQIXLMW-MHHMYNCNAZ
- SMILES: CCO[Al](OCC)OCC

Properties
Chemical formula	Al(OCH_{2}CH_{3})_{3}
Molar mass	162.165 g·mol^{−1}
Appearance	White powder
Density	1.142 g/cm^{3}
Melting point	140 °C (284 °F; 413 K)
Boiling point	320 °C (608 °F; 593 K)
Solubility in water	reacts violently
Solubility	slightly soluble in xylene, chlorobenzene

Hazards
- GHS labelling
Pictograms	(GHS02: Flammable) (GHS05: Corrosive)
Signal word	Danger
Hazard statements	H228, H314
Precautionary statements	P210, P280, P305+P351+P338, P310
Flash point	210 °C (410 °F; 483 K)
- Except where otherwise noted, data are given for materials in their standard state (at 25 °C [77 °F], 100 kPa). Infobox references

Aluminium ethoxide (also aluminium triethoxide) is an metallo-organic compound with the empirical formula Al(OCH_{2}CH_{3})_{3}. It is a moisture-sensitive white powder.

== Properties ==
Structure of aluminium isopropoxide indicates the tendency of aluminium alkoxides to form aggregates.

Aluminium triethoxide is slightly soluble in hot dimethyl benzene, chlorobenzene and other high boiling point non-polar solvents. It hydrolyzes to aluminium hydroxide and ethanol:

Al(OEt)_{3} + 3 H_{2}O → Al(OH)_{3} + 3 EtOH

Although the structure of aluminium triethoxide has not been established by X-ray crystallography, the related aluminium isopropoxide has a tetrameric structure as verified by NMR spectroscopy and X-ray crystallography. The species is described by the formula Al[(μ-O-i-Pr)_{2}Al(O-i-Pr)_{2}]_{3}. The unique central Al is octahedral, and three other Al centers adopt tetrahedral geometry. A

== Applications ==
Aluminium triethoxide is used as a reducing agent for aldehydes and ketones, and is also used as a polymerization catalyst. Aluminium triethoxide is mainly used in Sol-Gel Process preparation of high purity aluminium sesquioxide, which is a polymerization agent. At the same time, it is used as a reducing reagent, for example, carbonyl compounds that restore to alcohol.

== Synthesis ==
Aluminium triethoxide is produced by treating aluminium with anhydrous alcohol. The aluminium is often activated with iodine or by amalgamation to accelerate the reaction.

Aluminium triethoxide has been evaluated as a catalyst for the synthesis of esters and carbonates.
