= Isopropyl alcohol (data page) =

Chemical data page

This page provides supplementary chemical data on isopropanol.

== Material Safety Data Sheet ==
The handling of this chemical may incur notable safety precautions. It is highly recommend that you seek the Material Safety Datasheet (MSDS) for this chemical from a reliable source such as eChemPortal, and follow its directions.

== Structure and properties ==
Structure and properties
| Dielectric constant, ε_{r} | 18.23 ε_{0} at 25 °C |
| Bond strength | ? |
| Bond length | ? |
| Bond angle | ? |
| Magnetic susceptibility | ? |
| Surface tension | 21.7 dyn/cm at 20 °C |
| Viscosity | 4.5646 mPa·s at 0 °C; 2.3703 mPa·s at 20 °C; 1.3311 mPa·s at 40 °C |

== Thermodynamic properties ==
Phase behavior
| Triple point | 184.9 K (−88.2 °C), ? Pa |
| Std entropy change of fusion, Δ_{fus}S^{~~o~~} | 28.6 J/(mol·K) |
| Std entropy change of vaporization, Δ_{vap}S^{~~o~~} | 124 J/(mol·K) |
Solid properties
| Std enthalpy change of formation, Δ_{f}H^{~~o~~}_{solid} | ? kJ/mol |
| Standard molar entropy, S^{~~o~~}_{solid} | ? J/(mol K) |
| Heat capacity, c_{p} | 0.212 J/(mol K) at −200 °C |
Liquid properties
| Std enthalpy change of formation, Δ_{f}H^{~~o~~}_{liquid} | −318.2 kJ/mol |
| Standard molar entropy, S^{~~o~~}_{liquid} | 180 J/(mol K) |
| Heat capacity, c_{p} | 2.68 J/(gK) at 20 °C-25 °C |
Gas properties
| Std enthalpy change of formation, Δ_{f}H^{~~o~~}_{gas} | −261.1 kJ/mol |
| Standard molar entropy, S^{~~o~~}_{gas} | 333 J/(mol K) |
| Heat capacity, c_{p} | 1.54 J/(gK) at 25 °C |

== Vapor pressure of Iso-propyl Alcohol ==
| P in mm Hg | 1 | 10 | 40 | 100 | 400 | 760 | 1520 | 3800 | 7600 | 15200 | 30400 | 45600 |
| T in °C | −26.1 | 2.4 | 23.8 | 39.5 | 67.8 | 82.5 | 101.3 | 130.2 | 155.7 | 186.0 | 220.2 | — |

Table data obtained from CRC Handbook of Chemistry and Physics 44th ed.

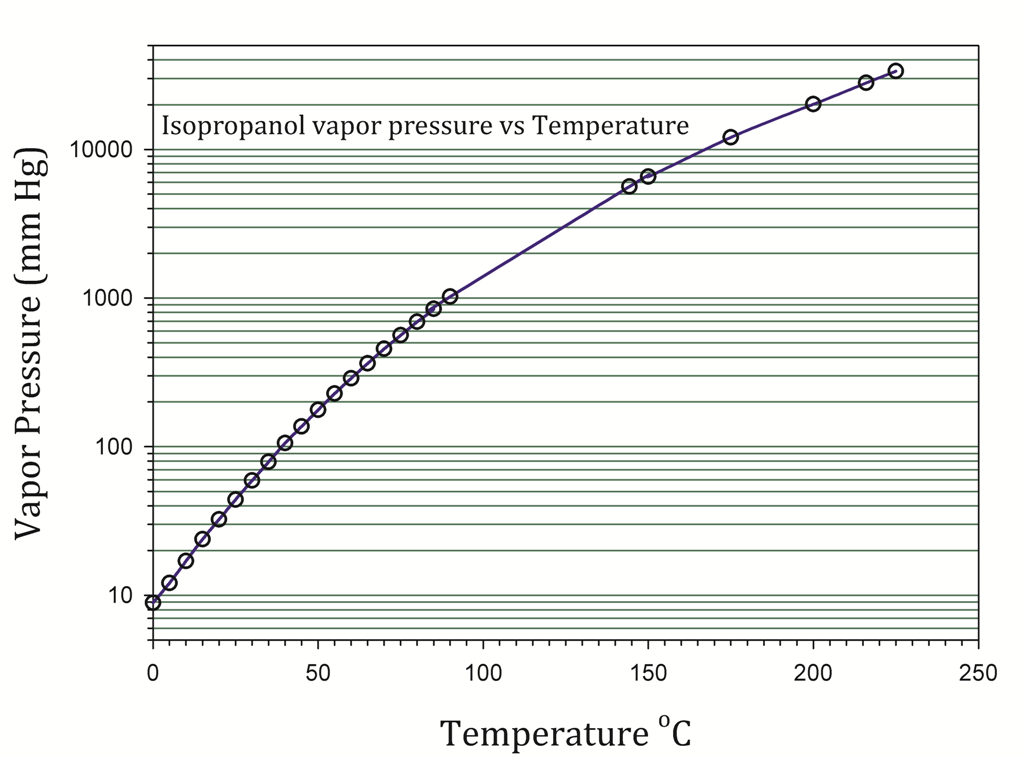
Isopropanol vapor pressure (logarithmic scale) vs temperature. Drawn using data published in

== Distillation data ==
Vapor-liquid equilibrium for isopropanol/water P = 760 mm Hg
| BP temp. °C | % by mole isopropanol |
| BP temp. °C | liquid | vapor |
| 82.2 | 100.00 | 100.00 |
| 81.48 | 95.35 | 93.25 |
| 80.70 | 87.25 | 83.40 |
| 80.37 | 80.90 | 77.45 |
| 80.23 | 76.50 | 73.70 |
| 80.11 | 69.55 | 69.15 |
| 80.16 | 66.05 | 67.15 |
| 80.15 | 64.60 | 66.45 |
| 80.31 | 55.90 | 62.55 |
| 80.38 | 51.45 | 60.75 |
| 80.67 | 44.60 | 59.20 |
| 80.90 | 38.35 | 57.00 |
| 81.28 | 29.80 | 55.10 |
| 81.29 | 29.75 | 55.40 |
| 81.23 | 28.35 | 55.30 |
| 81.62 | 24.50 | 53.90 |
| 81.75 | 19.35 | 53.20 |
| 81.58 | 18.95 | 53.75 |
| 81.99 | 16.65 | 52.15 |
| 82.32 | 12.15 | 51.20 |
| 82.70 | 10.00 | 50.15 |
| 84.57 | 5.70 | 45.65 |
| 88.05 | 3.65 | 36.55 |
| 93.40 | 1.60 | 21.15 |
| 95.17 | 1.15 | 16.30 |
| 100.0 | 0.00 | 0.00 |

Vapor-liquid equilibrium for isopropanol/methanol P = 101.325 kPa
| BP temp. °C | % by mole methanol |
| BP temp. °C | liquid | vapor |
| 64.37 | 100.0 | 100.0 |
| 67.34 | 81.26 | 90.32 |
| 67.64 | 79.45 | 89.10 |
| 69.54 | 68.64 | 81.73 |
| 70.77 | 61.72 | 76.52 |
| 71.88 | 55.96 | 71.76 |
| 72.78 | 51.03 | 67.78 |
| 73.80 | 46.34 | 63.08 |
| 74.85 | 39.75 | 56.21 |
| 75.65 | 35.50 | 51.62 |
| 76.36 | 31.71 | 46.91 |
| 77.93 | 23.79 | 35.98 |
| 78.67 | 19.49 | 30.22 |
| 79.45 | 15.45 | 24.40 |
| 80.04 | 12.30 | 19.56 |
| 80.57 | 9.30 | 14.66 |
| 80.82 | 8.43 | 12.43 |
| 82.20 | 0.0 | 0.0 |

Vapor-liquid equilibrium for isopropanol/acetone P = 101.325 kPa
| BP temp. °C | % by mole acetone |
| BP temp. °C | liquid | vapor |
| 77.92 | 6.12 | 19.90 |
| 76.71 | 8.28 | 25.52 |
| 71.50 | 19.59 | 47.03 |
| 70.99 | 20.91 | 48.90 |
| 69.20 | 26.01 | 55.29 |
| 68.85 | 27.10 | 56.50 |
| 65.91 | 37.55 | 66.12 |
| 63.55 | 48.12 | 73.37 |
| 63.42 | 48.74 | 73.75 |
| 62.46 | 53.77 | 76.63 |
| 62.37 | 54.27 | 76.91 |
| 61.85 | 57.22 | 78.49 |
| 61.86 | 57.12 | 78.43 |

See also

- Tetrachloroethylene (data page)

== Spectral data ==
UV-Vis
| λ_{max} | 205 nm |
| Extinction coefficient, ε | 100.2 m^{2}/mol |
IR
| Major absorption bands | 3334, 2970, 1466, 1378, 1160, 1128, 951, 817, 639 cm^{−1} |
NMR
| Proton NMR |
| Carbon-13 NMR |
| Other NMR data |
MS
| Masses of main fragments | m/z (% of relative intensity): 45 (100), 43 (19.1), 27 (16.8), 29 (12.5), 19 (9.9), 15 (9.5), 41 (8.2), 31 (6.8), 39 (6.6), 42 (4.4) |

This box:
- Except where noted otherwise, data relate to Standard temperature and pressure.
- Reliability of data general note.
