= Meerwein–Ponndorf–Verley reduction =

Reduction of ketones and aldehydes to their corresponding alcohols

Named after	Hans Meerwein; Wolfgang Ponndorf; Albert Verley
Reaction type	Organic redox reaction

Identifiers
Organic Chemistry Portal	meerwein-ponndorf-verley-reduction
RSC ontology ID	RXNO:0000089

The Meerwein–Ponndorf–Verley (MPV) reduction in organic chemistry is the reduction of ketones and aldehydes to their corresponding alcohols utilizing aluminium alkoxide catalysis in the presence of a sacrificial alcohol. The advantages of the MPV reduction lie in its high chemoselectivity and its use of a cheap environmentally friendly metal catalyst. MPV reductions have been described as "obsolete" owing to the development of sodium borohydride and related reagents.

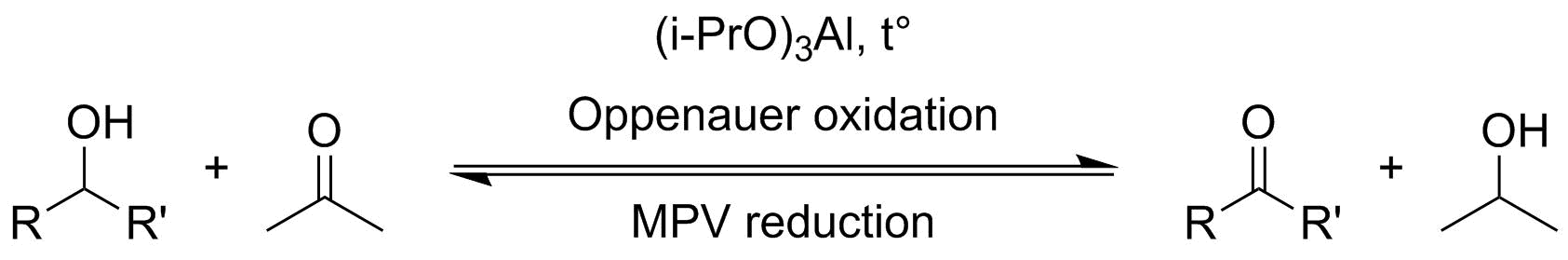
Meerwein–Ponndorf–Verley reduction

Figure 1, Exchange of carbonyl oxidation states in the presence of aluminium isopropoxide.

The MPV reduction was independently discovered by Albert Verley and the team of Hans Meerwein and Rudolf Schmidt in 1925. They found that a mixture of aluminium ethoxide and ethanol could reduce aldehydes to their alcohols. Ponndorf applied the reaction to ketones and upgraded the catalyst to aluminium isopropoxide in isopropanol.

== Mechanism ==
The MPV reduction is believed to go through a catalytic cycle involving a six-member ring transition state as shown in Figure 2. Starting with the aluminium alkoxide 1, a carbonyl oxygen is coordinated to achieve the tetra coordinated aluminium intermediate 2. Between intermediates 2 and 3 the hydride is transferred to the carbonyl from the alkoxy ligand via a pericyclic mechanism. At this point the new carbonyl dissociates and gives the tricoordinated aluminium species 4. Finally, an alcohol from solution displaces the newly reduced carbonyl to regenerate the catalyst 1.

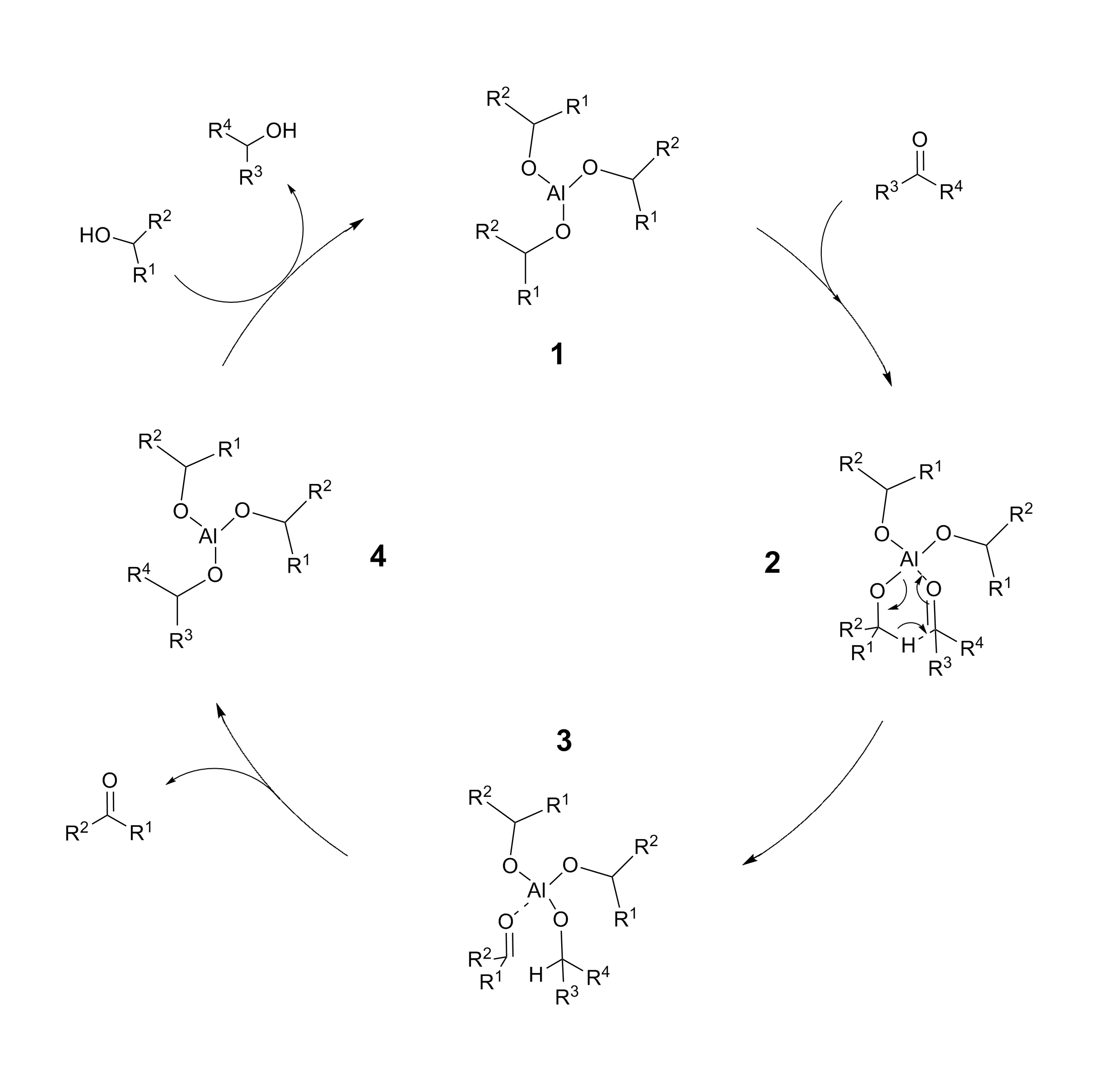
Meerwein–Ponndorf–Verley reduction catalytic cycle

Figure 2, Catalytic cycle of Meerwein–Ponndorf–Verley reduction

Each step in the cycle is reversible. The reaction is driven by the thermodynamic properties of the intermediates and the products. Several other mechanisms have been proposed for this reaction, including a radical mechanism as well as a mechanism involving an aluminium hydride species. The commonly accepted direct hydride transfer is supported by experimental and theoretical data.

== Chemoselectivity ==
One of the great draws of the Meerwein–Ponndorf–Verley reduction is its chemoselectivity. Aldehydes are reduced before ketones allowing for a measure of control over the reaction. If it is necessary to reduce one carbonyl in the presence of another, the common carbonyl protecting groups may be employed. Groups, such as alkenes and alkynes, that normally pose a problem for reduction by other means have no reactivity under these conditions.

== Stereoselectivity ==
The aluminium based Meerwein–Ponndorf–Verley reduction can be performed on prochiral ketones leading to chiral alcohols. The three main ways to achieve the asymmetric reduction is by use of a chiral alcohol hydride source, use of an intramolecular MPV reduction, or use of a chiral ligand on the aluminium alkoxide.

One method of achieving the asymmetric MPV reduction is with the use of chiral hydride donating alcohols. The use of chiral alcohol (R)-(+)-sec-o-bromophen-ethyl alcohol gave 82%ee (percent enantiomeric excess) in the reduction of 2-chloroacetophenone. This enantioselection is due to the sterics of the two phenol groups in the six membered transition state as shown in Figure 3. In Figure 3, 1 is favored over 2 due to the large steric effect in 2 from the two phenyl groups.

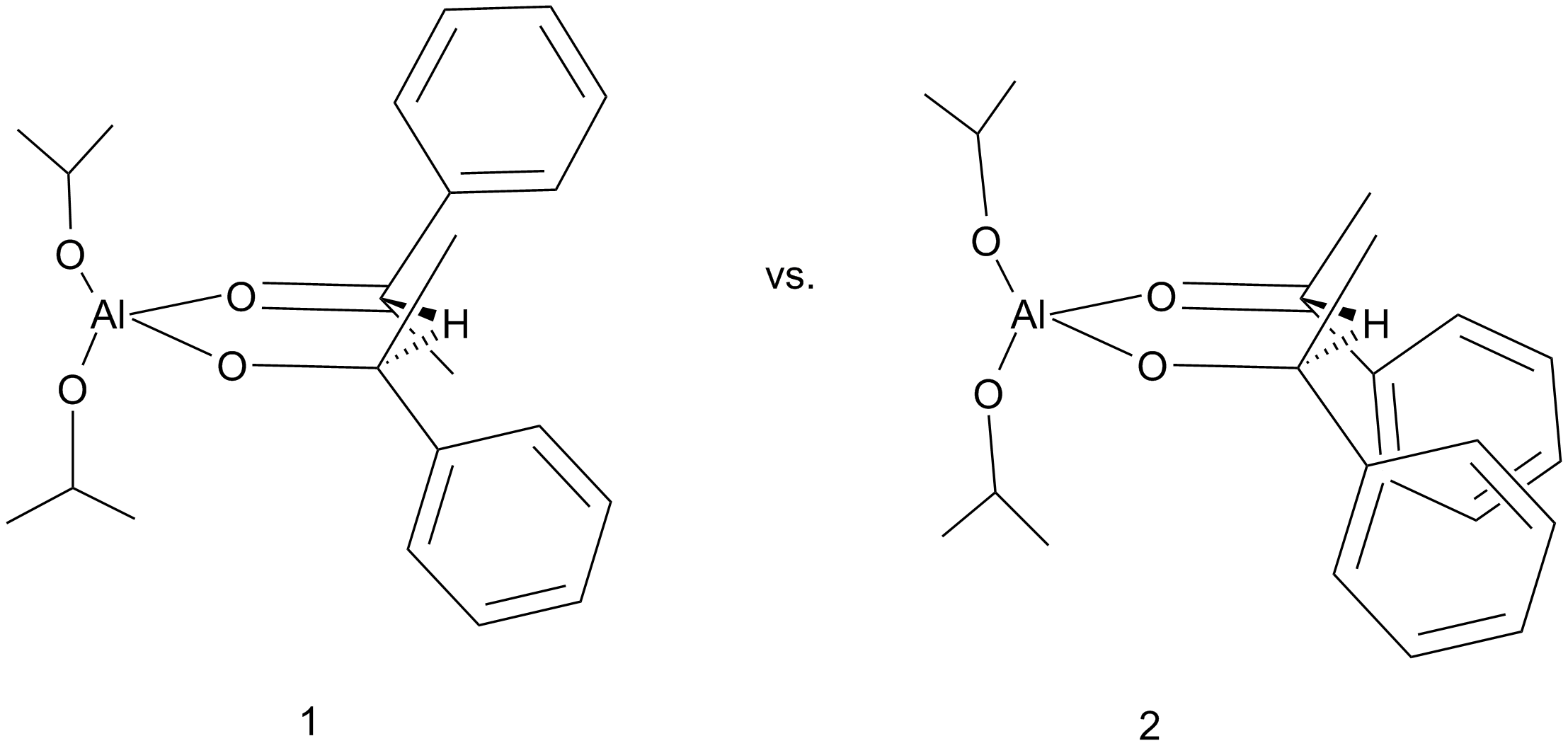
Meerwein–Ponndorf–Verley reduction with chiral alcohol

Figure 3, Transition states of MPV reduction with a chiral alcohol

The use of an intramolecular MPV reduction can give good enantiopurity. By tethering the ketone to the hydride source only one transition state is possible (Figure 4) leading to the asymmetric reduction. This method, however, has the ability to undergo the reverse Oppenauer oxidation due to the proximity of the two reagents. Thus the reaction runs under thermodynamic equilibrium with the ratio of the products related to their relative stabilities. After the reaction is run the hydride-source portion of the molecule can be removed.

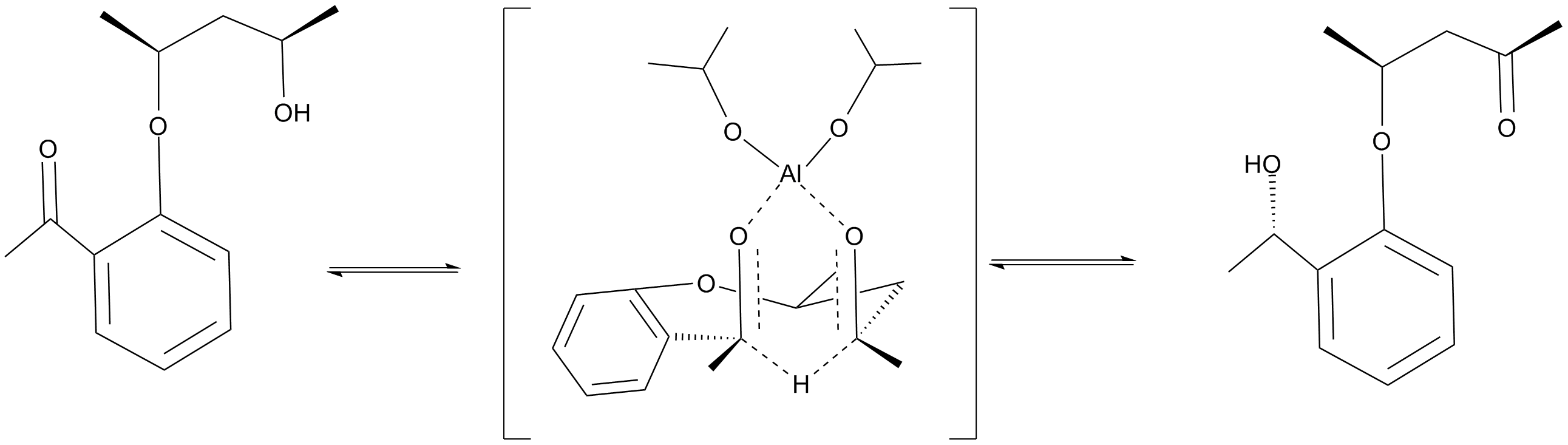
Intramolecular Meerwein–Ponndorf–Verley reduction

Figure 4, Transition state of intramolecular MPV reduction

Chiral ligands on the aluminium alkoxide can affect the stereochemical outcome of the MPV reduction. This method lead to the reduction of substituted acetophenones in up to 83%ee (Figure 5). The appeal of this method is that it uses a chiral ligand as opposed to a stoichiometric source of chirality. The low selectivity of this method is attributed to the shape of the transition state. It has been shown that the transition state is a planar six member transition state. This is different than the believed Zimmerman-Traxler model like transition state.

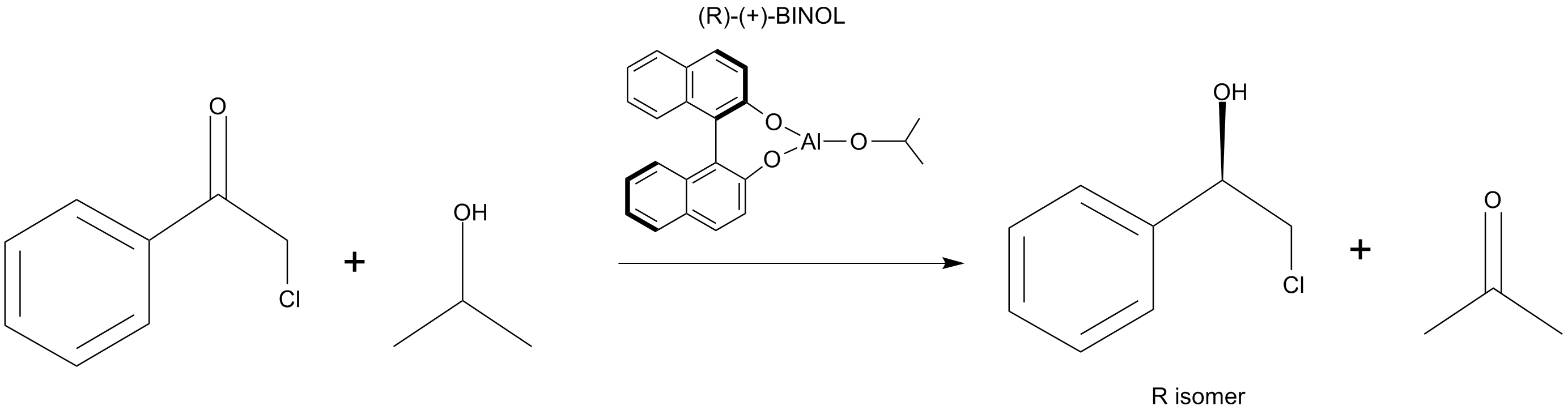
Meerwein–Ponndorf–Verley reduction with chiral ligand

Figure 5, MPV reaction with chiral ligand

== Scope ==
Several problems restrict the use of the Meerwein–Ponndorf–Verley reduction compared to the use of other reducing agents. The stereochemical control is seriously limited. Often a large amount of aluminium alkoxide is needed when using commercial reagent, and there are several known side reactions.

While commercial aluminium isopropoxide is available, the use of it often requires catalyst loadings of up to 100-200 mol%. This hinders the use of the MPV reduction on scale. Aluminium alkoxides made in situ from trimethyl aluminium reagents have far better activity requiring as little as 10% loading. The activity difference is believed to be due to the large aggregation state of the commercially available product.

Several side reactions are known to occur. In the case of ketones and especially aldehydes aldol condensations have been observed. Aldehydes with no α-hydrogens can undergo the Tishchenko reaction. Finally, in some cases the alcohol generated by the reduction can be dehydrated giving an alkyl carbon.

== Variations ==
The Meerwein–Ponndorf–Verley reduction has been used in the synthesis of chiral amines from ketimines using a chiral alkoxide. The addition of a phosphinoyl group to the nitrogen of the ketimine allowed for high enantioselectivity up to 98%ee.

Work has been done in the use of lanthanides and transition metals for the Meerwein–Ponndorf–Verley reduction. Both ruthenium and samarium have shown high yields and high stereoselectivity in the reduction of carbonyls to alcohols. The ruthenium catalyst has been shown, however, to go through a ruthenium hydride intermediate. The Meerwein–Ponndorf–Verley reduction has also been effected with synthetically useful yield by plutonium (III) isopropoxide.

The standard MPV reduction is a homogeneous reaction several heterogeneous reactions have been developed.

== See also ==
- Oppenauer oxidation
- Carbonyl reduction
