= Kulinkovich reaction =

Chemical reaction

Named after	Oleg Kulinkovich
Reaction type	Ring forming reaction

Identifiers
Organic Chemistry Portal	kulinkovich-reaction
RSC ontology ID	RXNO:0000682

The Kulinkovich reaction describes the organic synthesis of substituted cyclopropanols through reaction of esters with dialkyldialkoxytitanium reagents, which are generated in situ from Grignard reagents containing a hydrogen in beta-position and titanium(IV) alkoxides such as titanium isopropoxide. This reaction was first reported by Oleg Kulinkovich and coworkers in 1989.

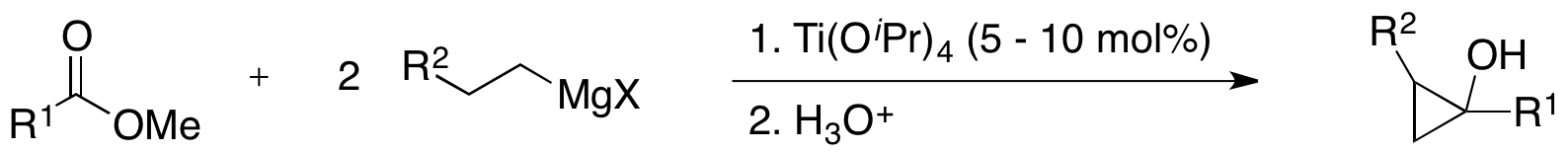
Kulinkovich reaction

Titanium catalysts are ClTi(OiPr)_{3} or Ti(OiPr)_{4}, ClTi(OtBu)_{3} or Ti(OtBu)_{4}, Grignard reagents are EtMgX, PrMgX or BuMgX. Solvents can be Et_{2}O, THF, toluene. Tolerated Functional Groups: Ethers R–O–R, R–S–R, Imines RN=CHR. Amides, primary and secondary amines. Carbamates typically do not tolerate the reaction conditions, but tert-butyl carbamates (N-Boc derivatives) survive the transformation.

An asymmetric version of this reaction is also known with a TADDOL-based catalyst.

== Reaction mechanism ==
The generally accepted reaction mechanism initially utilizes two successive stages of transmetallation of the committed Grignard reagent, leading to an intermediate dialkyldiisopropoxytitanium complex. This complex undergoes a dismutation to give an alkane molecule and a titanacyclopropane 1. The insertion of the carbonyl group of the ester in the weakest carbon-titanium bond, leads to an oxatitanacyclopentane 2 being rearranged to ketone 3. Lastly, the insertion of the carbonyl group of 3 in the residual carbon-titanium connection forms a cyclopropane ring. In the transition state of this elementary stage, which is the limiting stage of the reaction, an agostic interaction stabilizing between the beta hydrogen and the R2 group and the titanium atom was called upon to explain the diastereoselectivity observed. Complex 4 obtained is a tetraalkyloxytitanium compound able to play a part similar to that of the starting tetraisopropyloxytitanate, which closes the catalytic cycle. At the end of the reaction, the product is mainly in the shape of the magnesium alcoholate 5, giving the cyclopropanol after hydrolysis by the reaction medium.

The step leading to the titanacyclopropane has been scrutinized computationally. Although the dialkyldiisopropoxytitanium complex has been proposed to undergo β hydrogen elimination followed by C–H reductive elimination to give the alkane and 1, it was found that β hydrogen abstraction by the alkyl group, leading directly to products without the intermediate titanium hydride, is a more favorable process.

In broad strokes, and in a formal retrosynthetic sense, titanacyclopropane 1 behaves like a 1,2-dianion which adds into the ester twice: after the first addition into the ester, the resultant tetrahedral intermediate 2 collapses to give β-titanio ketone 3, which undergoes a second intramolecular addition to give the titanium salt of the cyclopropanol (4). (This species then undergoes transmetalation with Grignard reagent to regenerate 1 and close the catalytic cycle and give the product in the form of the magnesium salt (5).)

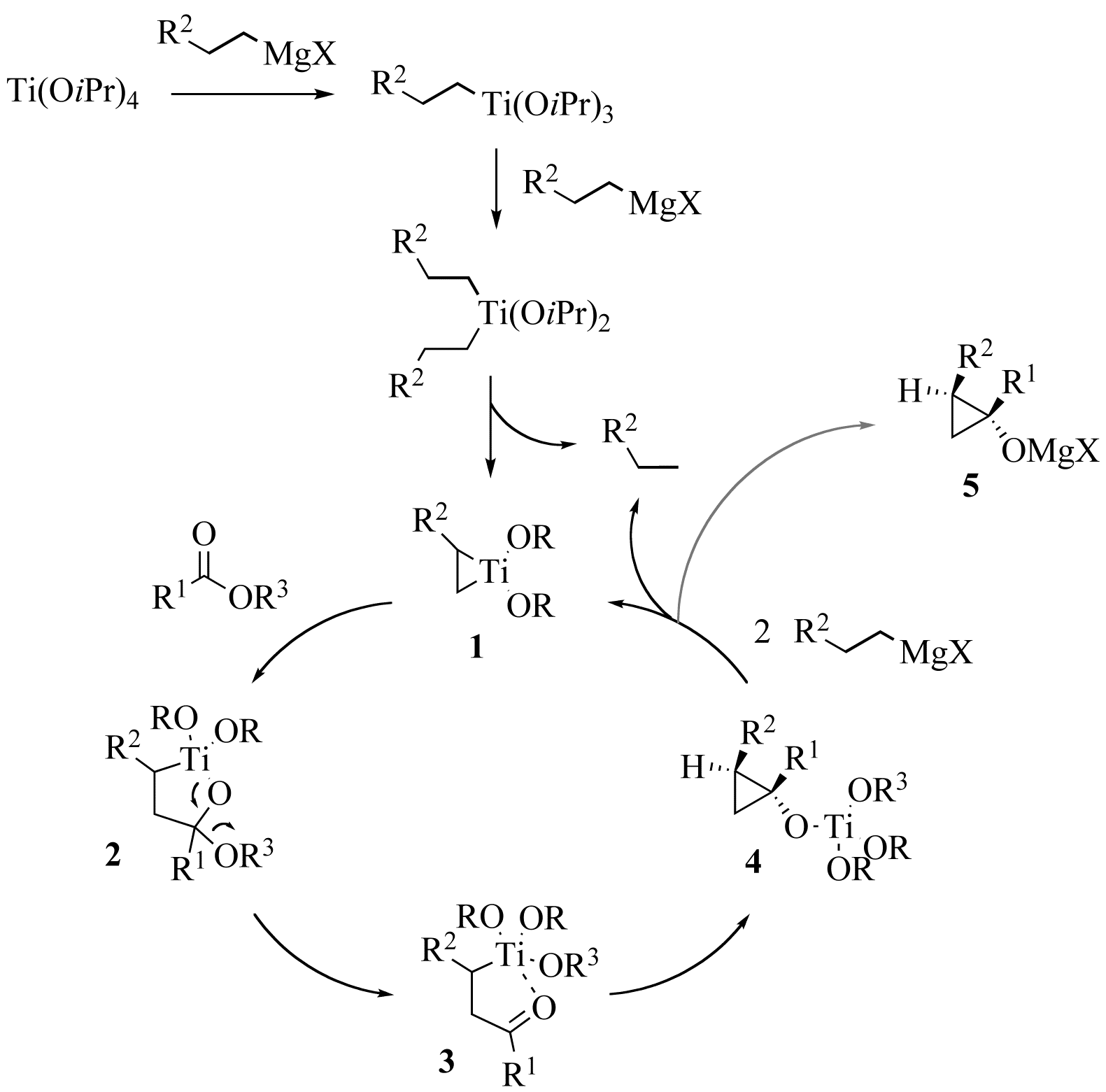

The reaction mechanism has been the subject of theoretical analysis. Certain points remain nevertheless obscure. Intermediate titanium complexes of the ate type have been proposed by Kulinkovich.

== Ligand exchange with olefins ==
In 1993, the team of Kulinkovich highlighted the aptitude of the titanacyclopropanes to undergo ligand exchange with olefins. This discovery was important, because it gave access to cyclopropanols more functionalized by making economic use of the Grignard of which normally at least two equivalents should have been engaged to obtain good yields. Cha and its team introduced the use of cyclic Grignard reagents, particularly adapted for these reactions.

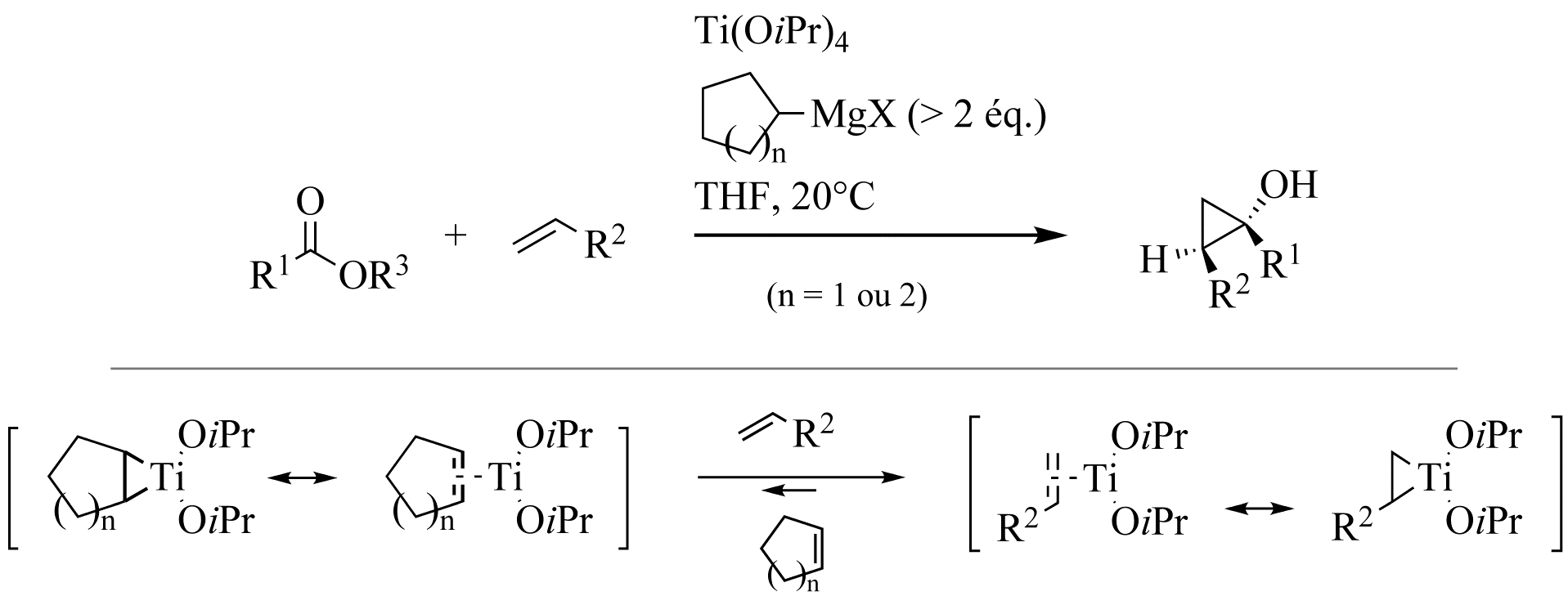

The methodology has been extended to intramolecular reactions

== De Meijere variation ==
Kulinkovich–De Meijere reaction
Named after	Oleg Kulinkovich; Armin de Meijere
Reaction type	Ring forming reaction

Identifiers
Organic Chemistry Portal	kulinkovich-demeijere-reaction
RSC ontology ID	RXNO:0000683

With amides instead of esters the reaction product is an aminocyclopropane in the De Meijere variation

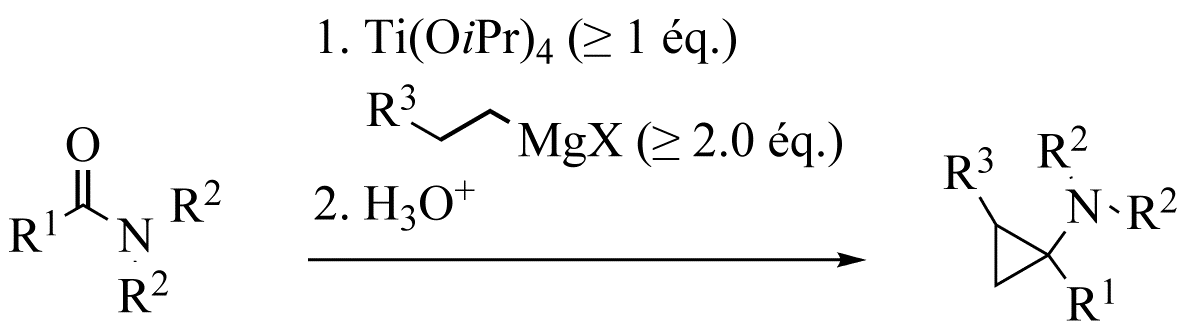

The intramolecular reaction is also known:

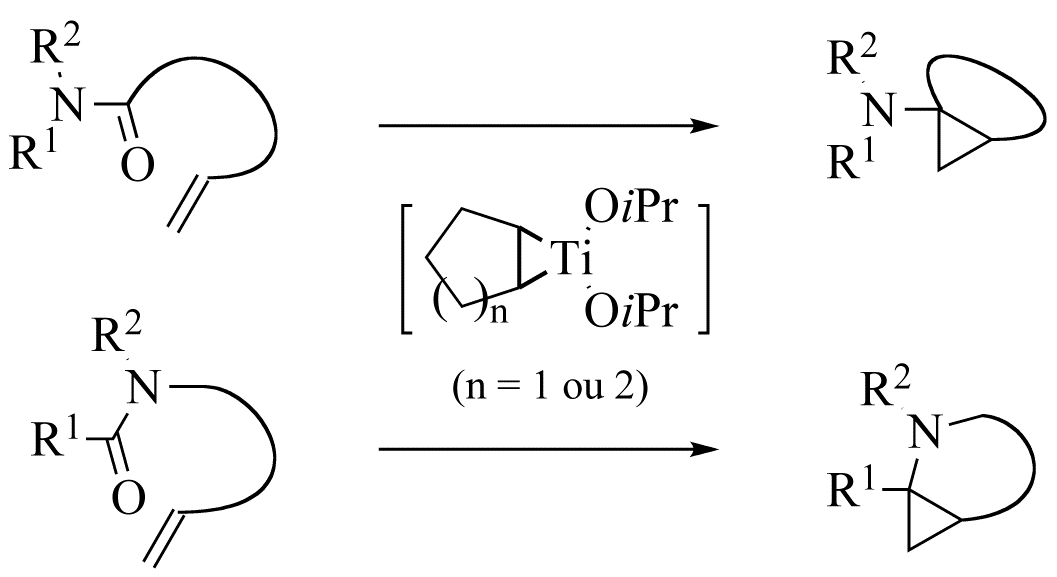

== Bertus-Szymoniak variation ==
Kulinkovich–Bertus-Szymoniak reaction
Named after	Oleg Kulinkovich; Philippe Bertus; Jan Szymoniak
Reaction type	Ring forming reaction

Identifiers
Organic Chemistry Portal	kulinkovich-szymoniak-reaction
RSC ontology ID	RXNO:0000684

In the Bertus-Szymoniak variation the substrate is a nitrile and the reaction product a cyclopropane with a primary amine group.

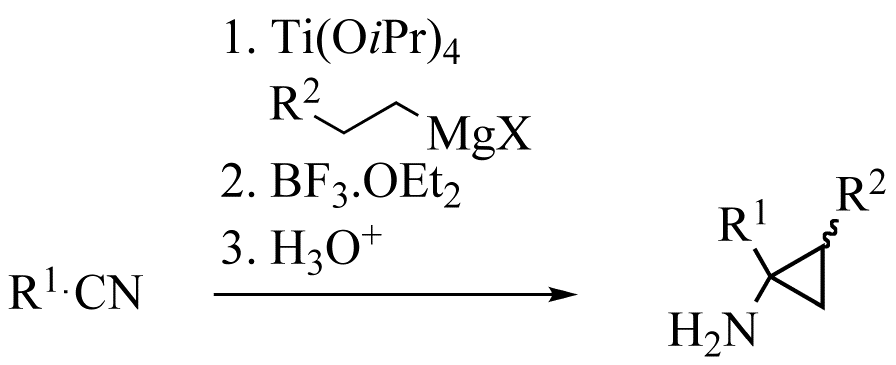

The reaction mechanism is akin the Kulinkovich reaction:

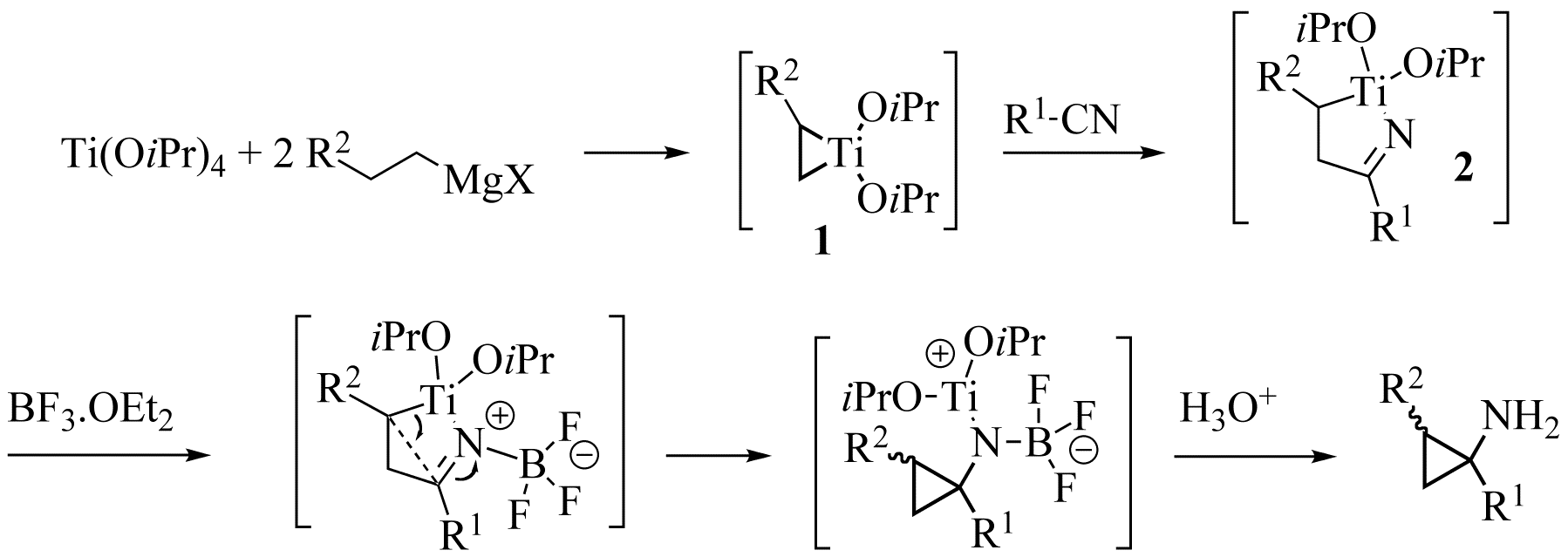

== Additional reading ==
- Kulinkovich, O. G.; Sviridov, S. V.; Vasilevski, D. A. (1991). "Titanium(IV) Isopropoxide-Catalyzed Formation of 1-Substituted Cyclopropanols in the Reaction of Ethylmagnesium Bromide with Methyl Alkanecarboxylates". Synthesis. 1991 (3): 234. doi:10.1055/s-1991-26431.
- Kulinkovich, O. G.; De Meijere, A. (2000). "1,n-Dicarbanionic Titanium Intermediates from Monocarbanionic Organometallics and Their Application in Organic Synthesis". Chem. Rev. 100 (8): 2789–834. doi:10.1021/cr980046z. PMID 11749306.
- Sato, F.; Urabe, H.; Okamoto, S. (2000). "Synthesis of organotitanium complexes from alkenes and alkynes and their synthetic applications". Chem. Rev. 100 (8): 2835–86. doi:10.1021/cr990277l. PMID 11749307.
- Wu, Y.-D.; Yu, Z.-X. (2001). "A theoretical study on the mechanism and diastereoselectivity of the Kulinkovich hydroxycyclopropanation reaction". J. Am. Chem. Soc. 123 (24): 5777–86. Bibcode:2001JAChS.123.5777W. doi:10.1021/ja010114q. PMID 11403612.
- Kulinkovich, O. G. (2004). "Alkylation of carboxylic acid derivatives with dialkoxytitanacyclopropane reagents". Russ. Chem. Bull. 53 (5): 1065–1086. doi:10.1023/B:RUCB.0000041303.52400.ca. S2CID 98642553.
- Wolan, A.; Six, Y. (2010). "Synthetic transformations mediated by the combination of titanium(IV) alkoxides and grignard reagents: Selectivity issues and recent applications. Part 1: Reactions of carbonyl derivatives and nitriles". Tetrahedron. 66: 15–61. doi:10.1016/j.tet.2009.10.050.
- Wolan, A.; Six, Y. (2010). "Synthetic transformations mediated by the combination of titanium(IV) alkoxides and Grignard reagents: Selectivity issues and recent applications. Part 2: Reactions of alkenes, allenes and alkynes". Tetrahedron. 66 (17): 3097–3133. doi:10.1016/j.tet.2010.01.079.
- Corey, E. J.; Rao, S. A.; Noe, M. C. (1994). "Catalytic Diastereoselective Synthesis of Cis-1,2-Disubstituted Cyclopropanols from Esters Using a Vicinal Dicarbanion Equivalent". Journal of the American Chemical Society. 116 (20): 9345. Bibcode:1994JAChS.116.9345C. doi:10.1021/ja00099a068.
