= Titanium ethoxide =

Chemical compound

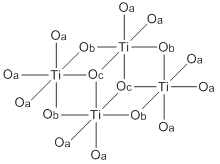
- Abbreviated structure of titanium(IV) ethoxide tetramer. The ethoxide ligands are represented by O's. The terminal ethoxide ligands are designated by Oa, the doubly bridging ligands by Ob, and the triply bridging ligands by Oc.

Names
- IUPAC name ethanolate; titanium(4+)
- Preferred IUPAC name Titanium(IV) ethoxide
- Systematic IUPAC name titanium(4+) tetraethanolate
- Other names Ethyl titanate, tetraethyl titanate

Identifiers
CAS Number	3087-36-3
3D model (JSmol)	Interactive image
ChemSpider	68993
ECHA InfoCard	100.019.464
EC Number	221-410-8
PubChem CID	76524
UNII	98L0R4158B
CompTox Dashboard (EPA)	DTXSID3044417
- InChI: InChI=1S/4C2H5O.Ti/c4*1-2-3;/h4*2H2,1H3;/q4*-1;+4 Key: JMXKSZRRTHPKDL-UHFFFAOYSA-N
- SMILES: CC[O-].CC[O-].CC[O-].CC[O-].[Ti+4]

Properties
Chemical formula	C_{32}H_{80}O_{16}Ti_{4}
Molar mass	228.109 g/mol
Appearance	colorless liquid
Density	1.088
Melting point	54 °C (129 °F; 327 K)
Boiling point	150–152 °C (302–306 °F; 423–425 K) (@10 mmHg)
- Except where otherwise noted, data are given for materials in their standard state (at 25 °C [77 °F], 100 kPa). Infobox references

Titanium ethoxide is a chemical compound with the formula Ti_{4}(OCH_{2}CH_{3})_{16}. It is a commercially available colorless liquid that is soluble in organic solvents but hydrolyzes readily. Its structure is more complex than suggested by its empirical formula. Like other alkoxides of titanium(IV) and zirconium(IV), it finds used in organic synthesis and materials science.

== Syntheses ==
Titanium ethoxide is prepared by treating titanium tetrachloride with ethanol in the presence of an amine:

TiCl_{4} + 4 EtOH + 4 Et_{3}N → Ti(OEt)_{4} + 4 Et_{3}NHCl

The purity of titanium ethoxide is commonly assayed by proton NMR spectroscopy. Ti(OEt)_{4} 1H NMR (90 MHz, chloroform-d, ppm): 4.36 (quartet, 8H, CH_{2}), 1.27 (triplet, 12H, CH_{3}).

== Structure ==
Both Ti(OEt)_{4} exist mainly as tetramers with an octahedral coordination environment around the metal centers. There are two types of titanium centers, depending on the number of terminal vs bridging alkoxide ligands. Zr(OEt)_{4} is structurally similar. The virtual symmetry of the M_{4}O_{16} core structure for the tetramer structures of these compounds is C_{2h}.

== Related compounds ==
=== Titanium methoxide ===
Like the ethoxide, titanium methoxide Ti(OMe)_{4} exists as a tetramer with each of the Ti^{IV} metal centers having an octahedral coordination environment.

=== Titanium isopropoxide ===
With bulky alkyl groups, Ti(O^{i}Pr)_{4} in contrast exist as a monomer with a tetrahedral environment around the Ti center. This lower degree of coordination to the metal center is attributed to the steric bulk of the ^{i}Pr groups versus the n-alkyl groups, this serves to prevent bridging interactions between the metal centers.

=== Zirconium ethoxide ===
Zirconium ethoxide can be prepared in a manner similar but not identical to the titanium compound:

ZrCl_{4} + 5 NaOEt + EtOH → NaH[Zr(OEt)_{6}] + 4 NaCl
NaH[Zr(OEt)_{6}] + HCl → Zr(OEt)_{4} + NaCl + 2 EtOH

A more common synthesis for zirconium ethoxide is to treat zirconium tetrachloride with the desired alcohol and ammonia:

ZrCl_{4} + 4 ROH + 4 NH_{3} → Zr(OR)_{4} + 4 NH_{4}Cl

Zirconium ethoxide can also be prepared with zirconocene dichloride:

Cp_{2}ZrCl_{2} + 4 EtOH + 2 Et_{3}N → 2 CpH + 2 Et_{3}NHCl + Zr(OEt)_{4}

=== Zirconium propoxide ===
Zr(O^{n}Pr)_{4} also adopts the titanium ethoxide structure.

== Reactions ==
Hydrolysis of Ti alkoxides can be used to deposit TiO_{2}:

Ti(OEt)_{4} + 2 H_{2}O → TiO_{2} + 4 EtOH

The course of the hydrolysis is affected by the presence of base or acid catalysts for the hydrolysis. Generally acid-catalysis yields a sol where the polymer chains are randomly oriented and linear. In the base-mediated case bushy clusters or crosslinked networks are produced, these structures can trap solvent and reaction byproducts and form a gel coating. This is the sol-gel process. Intermediates in the hydrolysis have been crystallized. They feature interior oxides in addition to the ethoxide on the exterior of the clusters.

The high reactivity of titanium ethoxide toward water is exploited in its use in condensation reactions.
