= Aldol–Tishchenko reaction =

The Aldol–Tishchenko reaction is a tandem reaction involving an aldol reaction and a Tishchenko reaction. In organic synthesis, it is a method to convert aldehydes and ketones into 1,3-hydroxyl compounds. The reaction sequence in many examples starts from conversion of a ketone into an enolate by action of lithium diisopropylamide (LDA), to which a suitable aldehyde is added. The resulting mono-ester diol is then converted into the diol by a hydrolysis step. With both the acetyl trimethylsilane and propiophenone as reactants, the diol is obtained as a pure diastereoisomer.

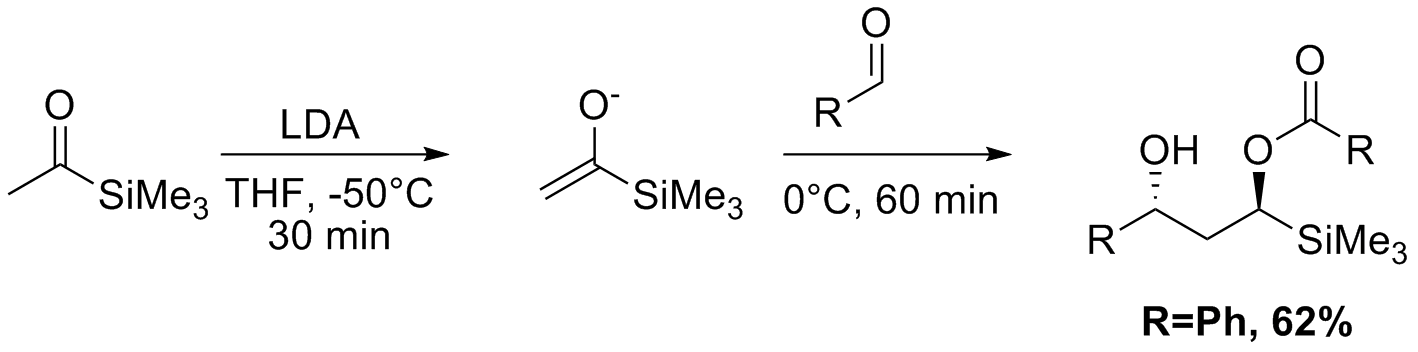
Aldol–Tishchenko reaction starting from acetyl trimethylsilane and acetaldehyde

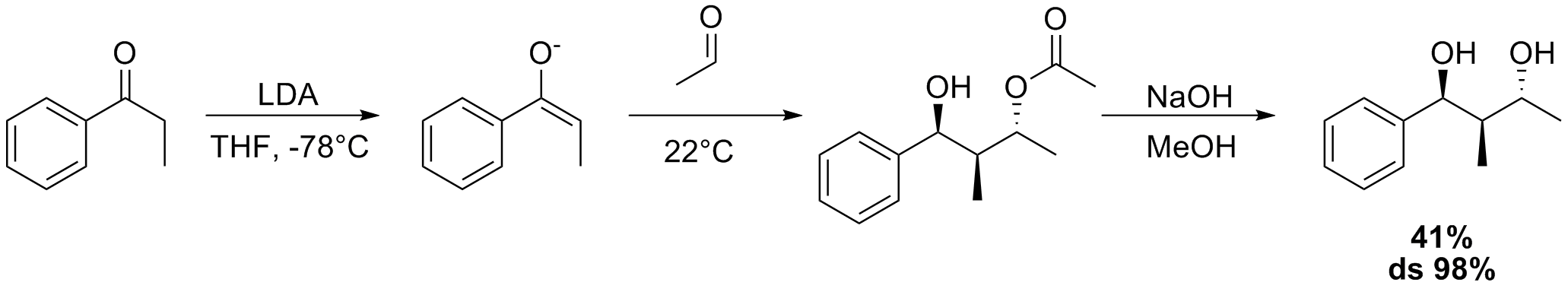
Aldol–Tishchenko reaction starting from propiophenone and acetaldehyde
