= Tishchenko reaction =

Disproportionation reaction of aldehydes

Named after	Vyacheslav Tishchenko
Reaction type	Organic redox reaction

Identifiers
Organic Chemistry Portal	tishchenko-reaction

The Tishchenko reaction is an organic chemical reaction that involves disproportionation of an aldehyde in the presence of an alkoxide. The reaction is named after Russian organic chemist Vyacheslav Tishchenko, who discovered that aluminium alkoxides are effective catalysts for the reaction.

In the related Cannizzaro reaction, the base is sodium hydroxide and then the oxidation product is a carboxylic acid and the reduction product is an alcohol.

== History ==
The reaction involving benzaldehyde was discovered by Claisen using sodium benzylate as base. The reaction produces benzyl benzoate.

The Tishchenko reaction: benzaldehyde reacts to benzyl benzoate, the catalyst is sodium benzylate.

Enolizable aldehydes are not amenable to Claisen's conditions. Vyacheslav Tishchenko discovered that aluminium alkoxides allowed the conversion of enolizable aldehydes to esters.

== Examples ==
- Paraformaldehyde reacts with boric acid to form methyl formate. The key step in the reaction mechanism for this reaction is a 1,3-hydride shift in the hemiacetal intermediate formed from two successive nucleophilic addition reactions, the first one from the catalyst. The hydride shift regenerates the alkoxide catalyst.

== Applications ==
Synthesis of esters directly from aldehydes.

Industrial production of esters such as ethyl acetate from acetaldehyde.

Key step in the Meerwein–Ponndorf–Verley (MPV) and Oppenauer oxidation related redox systems.

Demonstrates hydride transfer mechanism between aldehydes.

== See also ==
- Aldol–Tishchenko reaction
- Baylis–Hillman reaction
- Cannizzaro reaction
- Meerwein–Ponndorf–Verley reduction
- Oppenauer oxidation
