= Vyacheslav Tishchenko =

Russian chemist

Vyacheslav Evgenievich Tishchenko
- Born: August 19, 1861; St. Petersburg, Russian Empire
- Died: February 25, 1941 (aged 79); Leningrad, USSR
- Education: Saint Petersburg State University
- Known for: Tishchenko reaction
- Awards: USSR State Prize (Stalin Prize), 1941 (posthumous)
- Scientific career
- Fields: Organic chemistry
- Workplaces: Saint Petersburg State University

Vyacheslav Evgenievich Tishchenko (Вячеслав Евгеньевич Тищенко; 19 August 1861 – 25 February 1941) was a Russian chemist, best-known for the development of the Tishchenko reaction.

== Life and work ==
Tishchenko was born in 1861 in St. Petersburg, where he attended school before undertaking studies at Saint Petersburg State University (which was named Saint Petersburg Imperial University at the time). He worked in the laboratory of Alexander Butlerov, studying the interaction of paraformaldehyde with hydrohalic acids. Tishchenko graduated in 1884 and worked with Dmitri Mendeleev as a laboratory assistant and lecture assistant.

Tishchenko became a lecturer at St. Petersburg State University in 1891, where he taught analytical chemistry. He was sent to the Chicago World's Fair in 1893 and the Paris Exposition in 1900 in order to report back to his home university on the chemical technology exhibited at these expositions.

Following the 1917 October Revolution, Tishchenko headed a laboratory at the Russian State Institute of Applied Chemistry, which was affiliated with the military industry and focused on chemical synthesis.

In 1928, Tishchenko was named a Corresponding Member of the USSR Academy of Sciences, and was named an Academician in 1935.

== Chemistry ==
The Tishchenko reaction produces esters from an aldehyde and a ketone, or two equivalents of an aldehyde, in the presence of a sodium alkoxide as base.

Also named after him is the 'Tishchenko flask', a type of glassware used in absorption of gases.

In 1931, Tishchenko undertook work on the synthesis of camphene from pinene via a Wagner–Meerwein rearrangement. Similar methods were later used by Shering Company in the industrial synthesis.

== Biographical work ==
Tishchenko was among the first biographers of Mendeleev, collaborating with Mikhail Nikolaevich Mladentsev to publish a biography in 1938, Дмитрий Иванович Менделеев, его жизнь и деятельность (Dmitri Ivanovich Mendeleev, his life and work). Though not published until later, Tishchenko and Mladentsev also wrote a second biography, Дмитрий Иванович Менделеев, его жизнь и деятельность: Университетский период 1861-1890 (Dmitri Ivanovich Mendeleev, his life and work: University period 1861-1890). These biographies reprint several personal correspondences of Mendeleev's, and contain accounts of his professional and personal life, accentuated by the fact that Tishchenko knew and worked with Mendeleev.
