= Alkoxide =

Conjugate base of an alcohol

Structure of the methoxide anion. Although alkali metal alkoxides are not salts and adopt complex structures, they behave chemically as sources of RO^{−}.

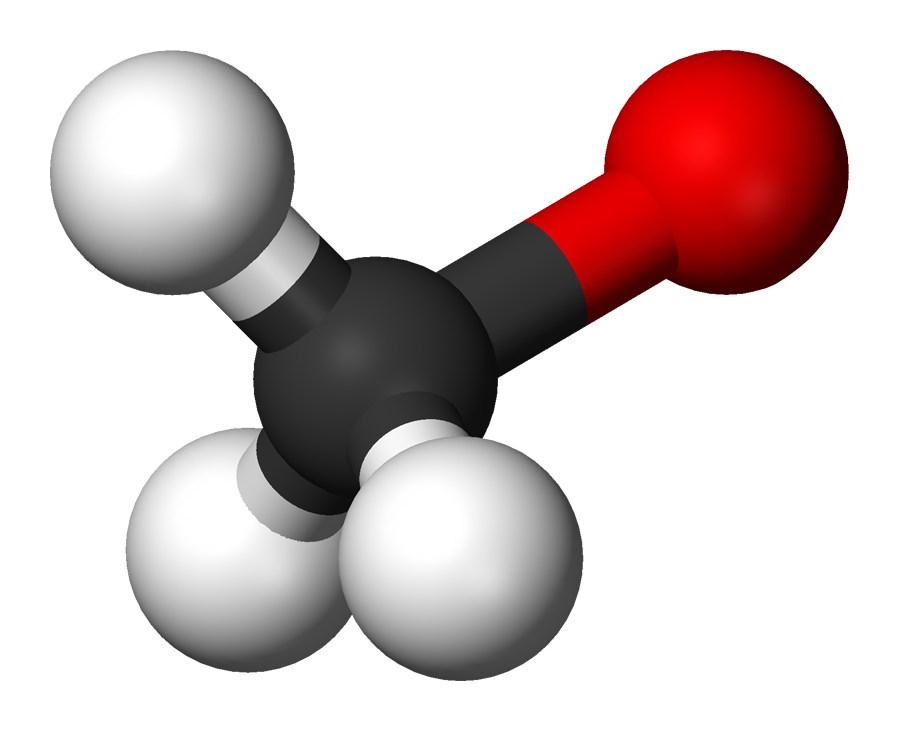
The structure of the methoxide ion

In chemistry, an alkoxide is the conjugate base of an alcohol and therefore consists of an organic group bonded to a negatively charged oxygen atom. They are written as RO^{−}, where R is the organyl substituent. Alkoxides are strong bases and, when R is not bulky, good nucleophiles and good ligands. Alkoxides, although generally not stable in protic solvents such as water, occur widely as intermediates in various reactions, including the Williamson ether synthesis. Transition metal alkoxides are widely used for coatings and as catalysts.

Enolates are unsaturated alkoxides derived by deprotonation of a C−H bond adjacent to a ketone or aldehyde. The nucleophilic center for simple alkoxides is located on the oxygen, whereas the nucleophilic site on enolates is delocalized onto both carbon and oxygen sites. Ynolates are also unsaturated alkoxides derived from acetylenic alcohols.

Phenoxides are close relatives of the alkoxides, in which the alkyl group is replaced by a phenyl group. Phenol is more acidic than a typical alcohol; thus, phenoxides are correspondingly less basic and less nucleophilic than alkoxides. They are, however, often easier to handle and yield derivatives that are more crystalline than those of the alkoxides.

== Structure ==
Alkali metal alkoxides are often oligomeric or polymeric compounds, especially when the R group is small (Me, Et). The alkoxide anion is a good bridging ligand, thus many alkoxides feature M_{2}O or M_{3}O linkages. In solution, the alkali metal derivatives exhibit strong ion-pairing, as expected for the alkali metal derivative of a strongly basic anion.

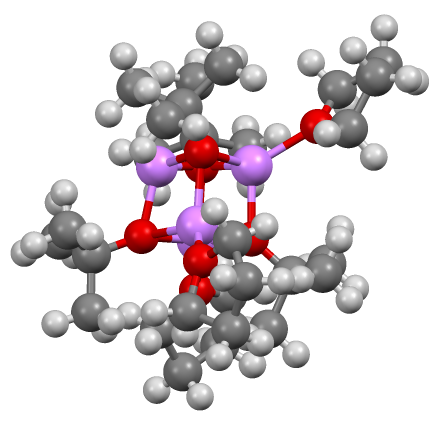
Structure of the Li_{4}(OBu-t)_{4}(thf)_{3} cluster, highlighting the tendency of alkoxides to aggregate and bind ether ligands. Carbon (C) Lithium (Li) Oxygen (O) Hydrogen (H)

== Preparation ==
=== From reducing metals ===
Alkoxides can be produced by several routes starting from an alcohol. Highly reducing metals react directly with alcohols to give the corresponding metal alkoxide. The alcohol serves as an acid, and hydrogen is produced as a by-product. A classic case is sodium methoxide produced by the addition of sodium metal to methanol:

2 CH_{3}OH + 2 Na → 2 CH_{3}ONa + H_{2}

Other alkali metals can be used in place of sodium, and most alcohols can be used in place of methanol. Generally, the alcohol is used in excess and left to be used as a solvent in the reaction. Thus, an alcoholic solution of the alkali alkoxide is used. Another similar reaction occurs when an alcohol is reacted with a metal hydride such as NaH. The metal hydride removes the hydrogen atom from the hydroxyl group and forms a negatively charged alkoxide ion.

== Properties ==
=== Reactions with alkyl halides ===
The alkoxide ion and its salts react with primary alkyl halides in an S_{N}2 reaction to form an ether via the Williamson ether synthesis.

=== Hydrolysis and transesterification ===
Aliphatic metal alkoxides decompose in water as summarized in this idealized equation:

Al(OR)_{3} + 3 H_{2}O → Al(OH)_{3} + 3 ROH

In the transesterification process, metal alkoxides react with esters to bring about an exchange of alkyl groups between metal alkoxide and ester. With the metal alkoxide complex in focus, the result is the same as for alcoholysis, namely the replacement of alkoxide ligands, but at the same time the alkyl groups of the ester are changed, which can also be the primary goal of the reaction. Sodium methoxide in solution, for example, is commonly used for this purpose, a reaction that is used in the production of biodiesel.

=== Formation of oxo-alkoxides ===
Many metal alkoxide compounds also feature oxo-ligands. Oxo-ligands typically arise via the hydrolysis, often accidentally, and via ether elimination:

RCO_{2}R' + CH_{3}O^{−} → RCO_{2}CH_{3} + R'O^{−}

=== Thermal stability ===
Many metal alkoxides thermally decompose in the range of approximately 100–300 °C. Depending on process conditions, this thermolysis can produce nanosized powders of oxide or metallic phases. This approach is a basis of processes of fabrication of functional materials intended for aircraft, space, electronic fields, and chemical industry: individual oxides, their solid solutions, complex oxides, powders of metals and alloys active towards sintering. Decomposition of mixtures of mono- and heterometallic alkoxide derivatives has also been examined. This method represents a prospective approach possessing an advantage of capability of obtaining functional materials with increased phase and chemical homogeneity and controllable grain size (including the preparation of nanosized materials) at relatively low temperature (less than 500–900 °C) as compared with the conventional techniques.

== Illustrative alkoxides ==
name	molecular formula	comment
Tetraethyl orthosilicate	Si(OEt)_{4}	for sol-gel processing of Si oxides; Si(OMe)_{4} is avoided for safety reasons
Aluminium isopropoxide	Al_{4}(O^{i}Pr)_{12}	reagent for Meerwein–Ponndorf–Verley reduction
Potassium tert-butoxide,	K_{4}(O^{t}Bu)_{4}	basic reagent in alcohol solution for organic elimination reactions

=== Sodium methoxide ===
Sodium methoxide, also called sodium methylate and sodium methanolate, is a white powder when pure. It is used as an initiator of an anionic addition polymerization with ethylene oxide, forming a polyether with high molecular weight. Both sodium methoxide and its counterpart prepared with potassium are frequently used as catalysts for commercial-scale production of biodiesel. In this process, vegetable oils or animal fats, which chemically are fatty acid triglycerides, are transesterified with methanol to give fatty acid methyl esters (FAMEs).

Sodium methoxide is produced on an industrial scale and is available from a number of chemical companies.

=== Potassium methoxide ===
Potassium methoxide in alcoholic solution is commonly used as a catalyst for transesterification in the production of biodiesel.
