= Peter Budd =

British chemist

- Born: Peter Martin Budd; Born in 1957; Asmara, Eritrea
- Education: St Mary's Primary School Finchley (1963–1968); M.E.G.M. English School, Asmara (1968–1972); St Lawrence College, Ramsgate (1972–1975)
- Alma mater: University of Manchester (BSc., PhD)
- Known for: Polymers of intrinsic microporosity Polyelectrolytes; Separation Membranes; Energy Storage
- Awards: Better World Award (Nominated – 2020)
- Scientific career
- Fields: Polymer Chemistry; Energy; Industrial Separations
- Workplaces: The University of Manchester
- Thesis: The Synthesis and Properties of Polypeptides (1981)
- Doctoral advisor: Dr. C. Price
- Website: personalpages.manchester.ac.uk/staff/Peter.Budd/default.htm

Peter Martin Budd is a British chemist and a Professor in the Department of Chemistry at The University of Manchester. His research in general is based on polymer chemistry, energy and industrial separations, specifically on the areas of Polymers of intrinsic microporosity (PIMs), energy storage, polyelectrolytes and separation membranes.

== Education ==
Budd was educated at St Mary's Primary School Finchley (1963 - 1968), M.E.G.M. English School, Asmara (1968 - 1972) and St Lawrence College, Ramsgate (1972 - 1975). He then completed both his Bachelor of Science and Doctor of Philosophy degree at University of Manchester in 1978 and 1981 respectively. His PhD on The Synthesis and Properties of Polypeptides was supervised by Dr. Colin Price.

== Research and career ==
Upon completing his PhD, Budd joined the British Petroleum Research Center in Sunbury-on-Thames where he worked on polymers and structural materials as a research chemist for 8 years. In 1989, he joined the University of Manchester as a lecturer and was later on promoted to the position of professor.

His research in general is based on polymer chemistry, energy and industrial separations, specifically on the areas of Polymers of intrinsic microporosity (PIMs), energy storage, polyelectrolytes and separation membranes.

Budd has committed to a wide variety of sustainability activities in terms of industrial separations and membranes, including conducting lectures, developing new university courses for which he was also nominated for the Better World Award in Outstanding teaching and learning innovation in social responsibility (2020). He is a member of the American Chemical Society, Society of Chemical Industry, European Membrane Society and a Fellow of the Higher Education Academy. He is also a Lay reader (Lay Preacher) since 2003, currently at All Saints Church in Cheadle Hulme.

=== Notable work ===
In 2004, a research led by Prof. Budd and Prof. Neil McKeown first published a paper on Polymers of intrinsic microporosity, also commonly known as PIMs. One of the major polymers currently in the world, it is used in several applications including adsorption of organic vapours, adsorption of organic molecules from solutions, hydrogen storage and as solid state adsorbents for waste water treatment. Several research have now been published on this unique type of polymer, including by Prof. Budd and several researchers across the globe, and it has been also used in the determination of the Robenson Plot in Membrane gas separation.

A wide range of literature has been published by Prof. Budd on the synthesis, structural, property and application analysis of PIMs as well as other polymers and membranes. The published work by Prof. Budd has received more than 25,000 citations as of September 2026.

=== Awards and nominations ===
- Better World Award (Nominated - 2020)

== Major Reviews and Publications ==
Major Publications by Prof. Peter Budd:

- Budd, Peter M.; McKeown, Neil B. (2010). "Exploitation of Intrinsic Microporosity in Polymer-Based Materials". Macromolecules. 43 (12): 5163–5176. Bibcode:2010MaMol..43.5163M. doi:10.1021/ma1006396.
- Budd, Peter M.; McKeown, Neil B. (2006). "Polymers of intrinsic microporosity (PIMs): organic materials for membrane separations, heterogeneous catalysis and hydrogen storage". Chem. Soc. Rev. 35 (8): 675–683. doi:10.1039/B600349D. PMID 16862268.
- Budd, Peter M.; Ghanem, Bader S.; McKeown, Neil B.; Reynolds, Kevin J.; Msayib, Kadhum J.; Tattershall, Carin E.; Fritsch, Detlev (2005). "Gas separation membranes from polymers of intrinsic microporosity". Journal of Membrane Science. 251 (1–2): 263–269. doi:10.1016/j.memsci.2005.01.009.
- Budd, Peter M.; Ghanem, Bader S.; McKeown, Neil B.; Elabas, Elssalhen S.; Msayib, Kadhum J.; Tattershall, Carin E.; Makhseed, Saad; Wang, Dong (2004). "Solution-processed, organophilic membrane derived from a polymer of intrinsic microporosity". Adv. Mater. 16 (5): 456–459. Bibcode:2004AdM....16..456B. doi:10.1002/adma.200306053. S2CID 95540635.
- Budd, Peter M.; Ghanem, Bader S.; McKeown, Neil B.; Makhseed, Saad; Msayib, Kadhum J.; Tattershall, Carin E. (2004). "Polymers of intrinsic microporosity (PIMs): robust, solution-processable, organic nanoporous materials". Chem. Comm. (2): 230–231. doi:10.1039/B311764B. PMID 14737563.
