= Zinc oxide nanoparticle =

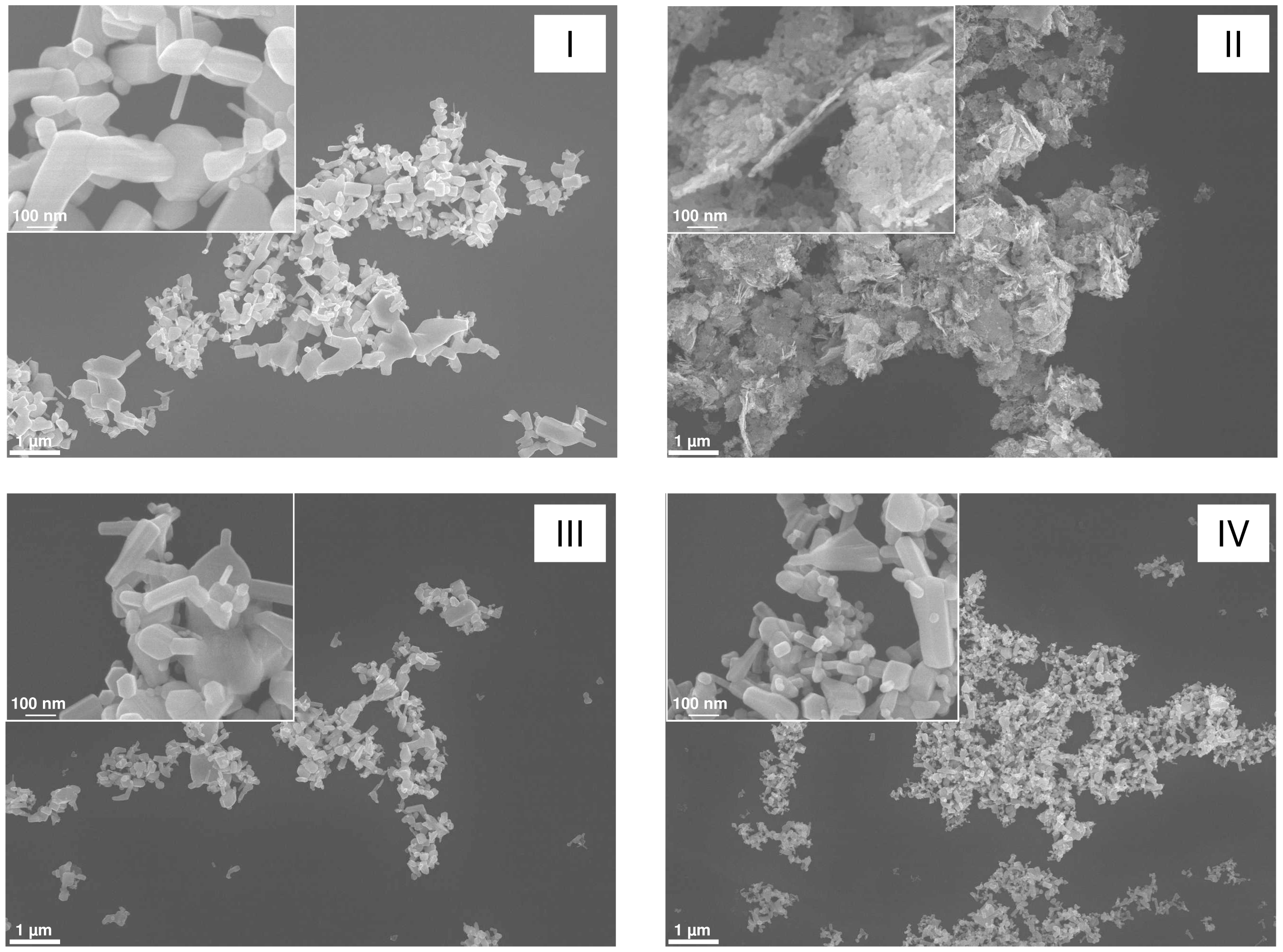
Scanning electron microscope images of four samples of zinc oxide nanoparticles from different vendors, showing differences in size and shape

Zinc oxide nanoparticles are nanoparticles of zinc oxide (ZnO) that have diameters less than 100 nanometers. They have a large surface area relative to their size and high catalytic activity. The exact physical and chemical properties of zinc oxide nanoparticles depend on the different ways they are synthesized. Some possible ways to produce ZnO nano-particles are laser ablation, hydrothermal methods, electrochemical depositions, sol–gel method, chemical vapor deposition, thermal decomposition, combustion methods, ultrasound, microwave-assisted combustion method, two-step mechanochemical–thermal synthesis, anodization, co-precipitation, electrophoretic deposition, and precipitation processes using solution concentration, pH, and washing medium. ZnO is a wide-bandgap semiconductor with an energy gap of 3.37 eV at room temperature.

ZnO nanoparticles are believed to be one of the three most produced nanomaterials, along with titanium dioxide nanoparticles and silicon dioxide nanoparticles. The most common use of ZnO nanoparticles is in sunscreen. They are used because they effectively absorb ultraviolet light but possess a large enough bandgap to be completely transparent to visible light. They are also being investigated to kill harmful microorganisms in packaging, and in UV-protective materials such as textiles. Many companies do not label products that contain nanoparticles, making it difficult to make statements about production and pervasiveness in consumer products.

Since ZnO nanoparticles are a relatively new material, there is concern over the potential hazards they can cause. Because they are very tiny, nanoparticles generally can travel throughout the body, and have been shown in animal studies to penetrate the placenta, blood–brain barrier, individual cells, and their nuclei. Tissues can absorb them easily due to their size, which makes it difficult to detect them. However, human skin is an effective barrier to ZnO nanoparticles, for example, when used as a sunscreen, unless abrasions occur. ZnO nanoparticles may enter the system from accidental ingestion of small quantities when putting on sunscreen. When sunscreen is washed off, the ZnO nanoparticles can leach into runoff water and travel up the food chain. As of 2011 there were no known human illnesses resulting from any engineered nanoparticles.

== See also ==
- ZnO nanostructures
