= Pollution from nanomaterials =

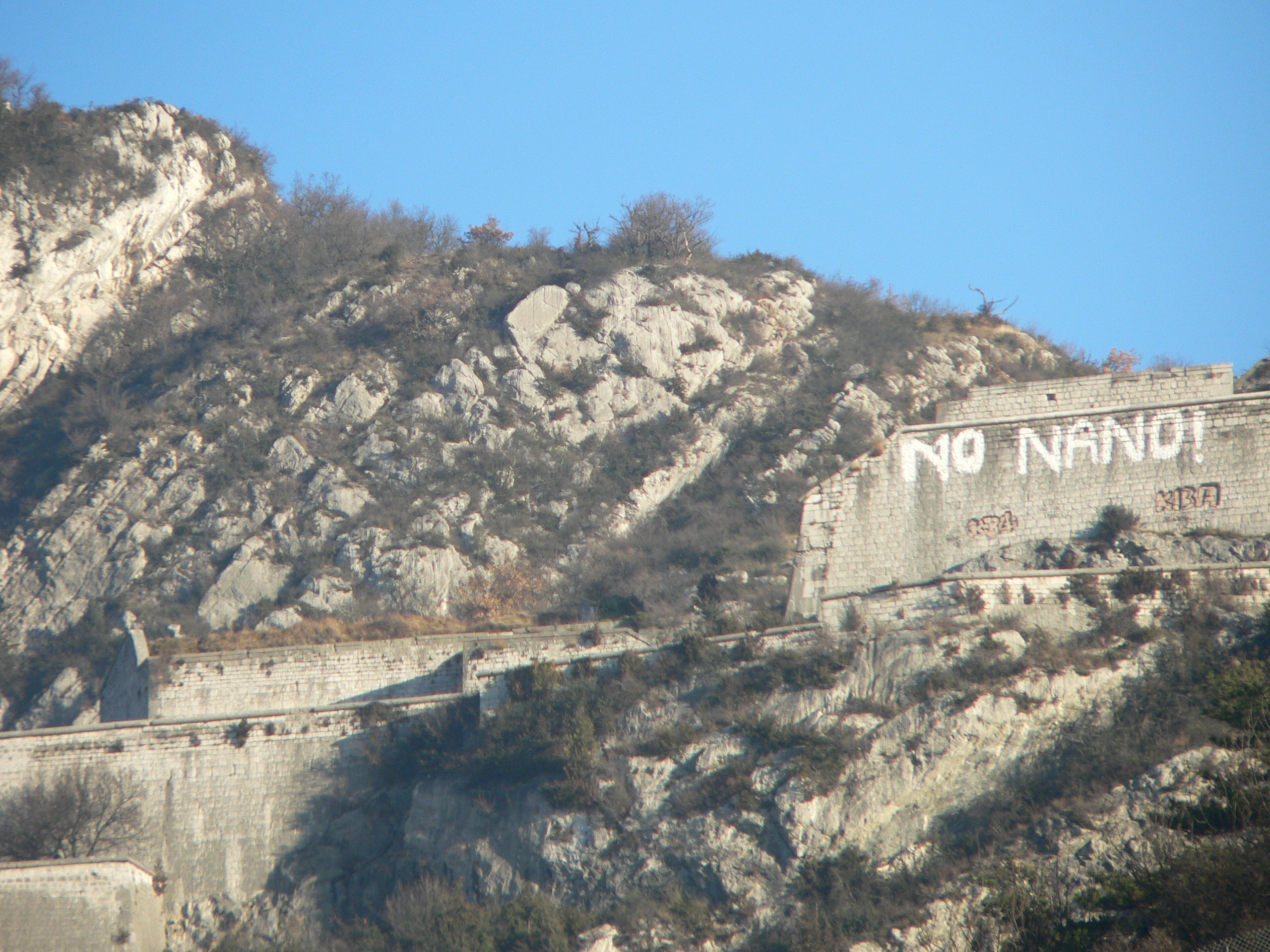
Groups opposing the installation of nanotechnology laboratories in Grenoble, France, spraypainted their opposition on a former fortress above the city in 2007.

Nanomaterials can be both incidental and engineered. Engineered nanomaterials (ENMs) are nanoparticles that are made for use, are defined as materials with dimensions between 1 and 100 nm, for example in cosmetics or pharmaceuticals like zinc oxide and TiO_{2} as well as microplastics. Incidental nanomaterials are found from sources such as cigarette smoke and building demolition. Engineered nanoparticles have become increasingly important for many applications in consumer and industrial products, which has resulted in an increased presence in the environment. This proliferation has instigated a growing body of research into the effects of nanoparticles on the environment. Natural nanoparticles include particles from natural processes like dust storms, volcanic eruptions, forest fires, and ocean water evaporation.

== Sources ==
Products containing nanoparticles such as cosmetics, coatings, paints, and catalytic additives can release nanoparticles into the environment in different ways. There are three main ways that nanoparticles enter the environment. The first is emission during the production of raw materials such as mining and refining operations. The second is emission during use, like cosmetics or sunblock getting washed into the environment. The third is emission after disposal of nanoparticle products or use during waste treatment, like nanoparticles in sewage and wastewater streams.

The first emission scenario, causing 2% of emissions, results from the production of materials. Studies of a precious metals refinery found that the mining and refining of metals releases a significant amount of nanoparticles into the air. Further analysis showed concentration levels of silver nanoparticles far higher than OSHA standards in the air despite operational ventilation. Wind speed can also cause nanoparticles generated in mining or related activities to spread further and have increased penetration power. A high wind speed can cause aerosolized particles to penetrate enclosures at a much higher rate than particles not exposed to wind.

Construction also generates nanoparticles during the manufacture and use of materials. The release of nanoscale materials can occur during the evacuation of waste from cleanout operations, losses during spray drying, filter residuals, and emissions from filters. Pump sprays and propellants on average can emit 1.1 x 10^8 and 8.6 x 10^9 particles/g.

A significant amount of nanoparticles are also released during the handling of dry powders, even when contained in fume hoods. Particles on construction sites can have prolonged exposure to the atmosphere and thus are more likely to enter the environment. Nanoparticles in concrete construction and recycling introduce a new hazard during the demolition process, which can pose even higher environmental exposure risks. Concrete modified with nanoparticles is almost impossible to separate from conventional concrete, so the release may be uncontrollable if demolished using conventional means. Even normal abrasion and deterioration of buildings can release nanoparticles into the environment on a long-term basis. Normal weathering can release 10 to 10^5 mg/m^2 fragments containing nanomaterials.

Another emission scenario is release during use. Sunscreens can release a significant amount of Titanium dioxide (TiO_{2}) nanoparticles into surface waters. Testing of the Old Danube Lake indicated that there were significant concentrations of nanoparticles from cosmetics in the water. Conservative estimates calculate that there were approximately 27.2 micrograms/L of TiO_{2}, if TiO_{2} was distributed throughout the entire 3.5*10^6 M^3 volume of the lake.

Although TiO_{2} is generally considered weakly soluble, these nanoparticles undergo weathering and transformation under conditions in acidic soils with high proportions of organic and inorganic acids. There are observable differences in particle morphology between manufactured and natural TIO_{2} nanoparticles, though differences may attenuate over time due to weathering. However, these processes are likely to take decades.

Copper and zinc oxide nanoparticles that get into the water can additionally act as chemosensitizers in sea urchin embryos. It is predicted that for animals in aquatic systems sunscreen is probably the most important exposure route to harmful metal particles. ZnOs from sunblock and other applications like paints, optoelectronics, and pharmaceuticals are entering the environment at an increasing rate. Their effects can be genotoxic, mutagenic, and cytotoxic.

Nanoparticles can be transported through different mediums depending on their type. Emissions patterns have found that TiO_{2} NPs accumulate in sludge-treated soils. This means that the dominating emission pathway is through wastewater. ZnO generally collects in natural and urban soil as well as landfills. Silver nanoparticles from production and mining operations generally enter landfills and wastewater. Comparing different reservoirs by how readily nanoparticles pollute them, ~63-91% of NPs accumulate in landfills, 8-28% in soils, aquatic environments receive ~7%, and air around 1.5%.

== Exposure toxicity ==
Knowledge of the effects of industrial nanoparticles (NPs) released into the environment remains limited. Effects vary widely over aquatic and terrestrial environments as well as types of organisms. The characteristics of the nanoparticle itself plays a wide variety of roles including size, charge, composition, surface chemistry, etc. Nanoparticles released into the environment can potentially interact with pre-existing contaminants, leading to cascading biological effects that are currently poorly understood.

Several scientific studies have indicated that nanoparticles can cause a series of adverse physiological and cellular effects on plants including root length inhibition, biomass reduction, altered transpiration rate, developmental delay, chlorophyll synthesis disruption, cell membrane damage, and chromosomal aberration. Though genetic damage induced by metal nanoparticles in plants has been documented, the mechanism of that damage, its severity, and whether the damage is reversible remain active areas of study. Studies of CeO2 nanoparticles were shown to greatly diminish nitrogen fixation in the root nodules of soybean plants, leading to stunted growth. Positive charges on nanoparticles were shown to destroy the membrane lipid bilayers in animal cells and interfere with overall cellular structure. For animals, it has been shown that nanoparticles can provoke inflammation, oxidative stress, and modification of mitochondrial distribution. These effects were dose-dependent and varied by nanoparticle type.

Present research indicates that biomagnification of nanoparticles through trophic levels is highly dependent upon the type of nanoparticles and biota in question. While some instances of bioaccumulation of nanoparticles exist, there is no general consensus.

== Difficulties in measurement ==
There is no clear consensus on potential human and ecological impacts stemming from exposure to ENMs. As a result, developing reliable methods for testing ENM toxicity assessment has been a high priority for commercial usage. However, ENMs are found in a variety of conditions making a universal testing method non-viable. Currently, both in-vitro and in-vivo assessments are used, where the effects of NPs on events such as apoptosis, or conditions like cell viability, are observed.

In measuring ENMs, addressing and accounting for uncertainties such as impurities and biological variability is crucial. In the case of ENMs, some concerns include changes that occur during testing such as agglomeration and interaction with substances in the testing media, as well as how ENMS disperse in the environment. For example, one investigation into how the presence of fullerenes impacted largemouth bass in 2004 concluded that fullerenes were responsible for neurological damage done to the fish, whereas subsequent studies revealed this was actually a result of byproducts resulting from the dispersal of fullerenes into tetrahydrofuran (THF) and minimal toxicity was observed when water was used in its place. Fortunately, greater thoroughness in the process of testing could help to resolve these issues. One method that has proven useful in avoiding artifacts is the thorough characterization of ENMS in the laboratory conducting the testing rather than just relying on the information provided by manufacturers.

In addition to problems that can arise due to testing, there is contention on how to ensure testing is done for environmentally relevant conditions, partly due to the difficulty of detecting and quantifying ENMs in complex environmental matrices. Currently, straightforward analytical methods are not available for the detection of NPs in the environment, although computer modeling is thought to be a potential pathway moving forward. A push to focus on the development of internationally agreed upon unbiased toxicological models holds promise to provide greater consensus within the field as well as enable more accurate determinations of ENMs in the environment.

== Regulation and organizations ==
The regulation of nanomaterials is present in the U.S. and many other countries globally. Policy is directed mainly at manufacturing exposure of NPs in the environment.

=== International / intergovernmental organizations ===
As of 2013, the OECD Working Party on Nanomaterials (WPN) worked on a multitude of projects with the purpose of mitigating potential threats and hazards associated with nanoparticles. The WPN conducted research on methods for testing, improvements on field assessments, exposure relief, and efforts to educate individuals and organizations on environmental sustainability with respect to NPs.

The International Organization for Standardization TC 229 focuses on standardizing manufacturing, nomenclature/terminology, instrumentation, testing and assessment methodology, and safety, health, and environmental practices.

=== North America ===
In the United States, the FDA and OSHA focus on regulations that prevent toxic harm to people from NPs, whereas the EPA takes on environmental policies to inhibit harmful effects nanomaterials may pose on the planet.

As of 2019, there were supporters and opponents of increased regulation. Supporters of regulation want NPs to be seen as a class and/or have the precautionary principle applied. Opponents believe that over-regulation could lead to harmful effects on the economy and customer and economic freedom. As of 2019, there were multiple policies up for consideration for the purpose of changing nanomaterial regulation.

The EPA is tackling regulations through two approaches under the TSCA: information gathering rule on new to old NMs and required premanufacturing notification for novice NMs. The gathering rule requires companies that produce or import NMs to provide the EPA with chemical properties, production/use amounts, manufacturing methods, and any found health, safety, and environmental impact for any nanomaterials being used. The premanufacturing notifications gives the EPA better governance over nanomaterial exposure, health testing, manufacturing/process and worker safety, and release amount which can allow the agency to take control of a NM if it poses concerning risk.

The United States National Nanotechnology Initiative involves 20 departments and independent agencies that focus on nanotechnology innovation and regulation in the United States. Projects and activities of NNI span from R&D to policy on environment and safety regulations of NMs.

NIEHS built itself from the complications that came with conducting research and assessment on nanomaterials. NIEHS realized the rapid adoption of NMs in products from a large variety of industries, and since then the organization has supported research focused on understanding the underlying threats NMs may pose on the environment and people.

The Canada-U.S. Regulatory Cooperation Council (RCC) Nanotechnology Initiative was constructed in order for the U.S. and Canada to protect and improve safety and environmental impacts of NMs without hindering growth and investment in NMs for both countries. The RCC oversees both countries and has maintained regulations, worked to create new regulations with the goal of alignment, secure transparency, and ensure that new and beneficial opportunities in the nanotechnology sector were shared with both countries.

=== Europe ===
Nanomaterials are defined consistently in both Registration, Evaluation, Authorisation and Restriction of Chemicals and Classification, Labeling, and Packaging legislations, in order to promote harmony in industry use. In January, 2020 REACH listed explicit requirements for businesses that import or manufacture NMs in Annex I, III, VI, VII-XI, and XII. Reporting of chemical characteristics/properties, safety assessments, and downstream user obligations of NMs are all required for reporting to the ECHA.

The Biocidal Products Regulation (BPR) has different regulation and reporting requirements than what is stated in REACH and CLP. Data and risk assessments are required for substance approval, specific labeling requirements are needed, and reporting on the substance which includes current use and potential risks must be done every 5 years.

=== Asia ===
The Asia Nano Forum (ANF) focuses on ensuring responsible manufacturing of nanomaterials that are environmentally, economically, and population safe. ANF supports joint projects with a focus on supporting safe development in emerging economies and technical research. Overall, the organization helps promote homogenous regulation and policy on NMs in Asia.

The Chinese National Nanotechnology Standardization Technical Committee (NSTC) reviews standards and regulation policies. The technical committee SAC/TC279 focuses on normalizing terminology, methodology, assessment methods, and material use in the field. The committee develops specific test protocols and technical standards for companies manufacturing NMs. In addition, the NSTC is constantly adding to their nano-material toxicology database in order to better standards and regulation.

== See also ==
- Nanotoxicology
