= Polymers of intrinsic microporosity =

Polymers of intrinsic microporosity (PIMs) are a unique class of microporous material developed by research efforts led by Neil McKeown, Peter Budd, et al. PIMs contain a continuous network of interconnected intermolecular voids less than 2 nm in width. Classified as a porous organic polymer, PIMs generate porosity from their rigid and contorted macromolecular chains that do not efficiently pack in the solid state. PIMs are composed of a fused ring sequences interrupted by Spiro-centers or other sites of contortion along the backbone. Due to their fused ring structure PIMs cannot rotate freely along the polymer backbone, ensuring the macromolecular components conformation cannot rearrange and ensuring the highly contorted shape is fixed during synthesis.

== Synthesis ==
PIMs require that the non-network macromolecular structure is rigid and non-linear. In order to maintain permanent microporosity the rotation along the polymer chain must be prohibited through the use of fused ring structure or strongly hindered by steric inhibition to avoid conformation changes that would allow the polymer to pack efficiently. This results in the use of a conformationally locked monomer and a polymerization reaction that provides a linkage about which rotation is prohibited. Three main types of polymerization reactions have been successfully used to prepare PIMs of sufficient mass to form self-standing films. These involve a polymerization reaction based on a double aromatic nucleophilic substitution mechanism to form the dibenzodioxin linkage, a polymerization using Troger's base formation, and amide linkages formation between monomeric units. It is also possible to modify the structure of PIMs by post-synthesis reactions. However, this can result in a reduction in intrinsic microporosity due to the additional interchain cohesive interactions.

== Applications ==
Due to the presence of intrinsic microporosity these polymers have high-free volume, high internal surface area, and have a high affinity for gases. A novel property of PIMs is that they do not possess a network structure and are often freely soluble in organic solvents. This allows PIMs to be precipitated or cast from solution to give microporous powders or self-standing films that are useful for a variety of applications. For example the first commercial application of PIMs was in a sensor developed by 3M. Additionally, due to PIMs affinity for small gases and ability to form self-standing films they are actively being investigated as a membrane material and adsorbent for industrial separation processes such as gas separation and carbon dioxide capture. PIM membranes are also heavily investigated due to their contribution in the revision of the 2008 upper bounds of performance by Robeson, an important parameter in membrane gas separation stating that the permeability must be sacrificed for selectivity. Specifically active areas of PIM membrane research include, enhancing permeability, decreasing aging, and tailoring selectivity. PIMs are also used to create mixed matrix membranes with a variety of material such as inorganic materials, metal-organic frameworks, and carbons.
