= Zinc oxide =

White powder insoluble in water

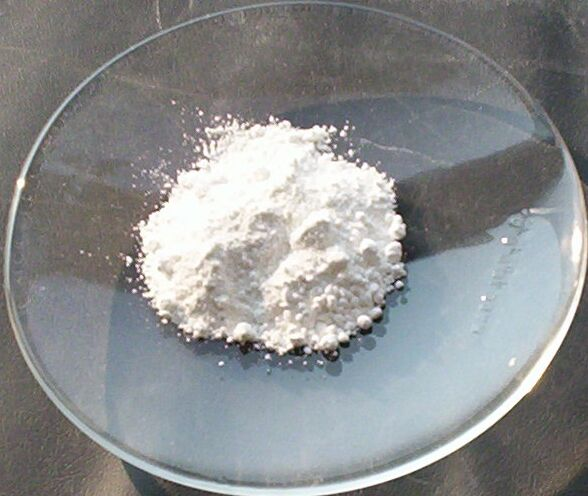

Names
- Other names Zinc white, calamine, philosopher's wool, Chinese white, flowers of zinc, zinca

Identifiers
CAS Number	1314-13-2
3D model (JSmol)	Interactive image
ChEBI	CHEBI:36560
ChEMBL	ChEMBL3988900
ChemSpider	14122
DrugBank	DB09321
ECHA InfoCard	100.013.839
EC Number	215-222-5
Gmelin Reference	13738
KEGG	C12570
PubChem CID	14806
RTECS number	ZH4810000
UNII	SOI2LOH54Z
UN number	3077
CompTox Dashboard (EPA)	DTXSID7035016
- InChI: InChI=1S/O.Zn Key: XLOMVQKBTHCTTD-UHFFFAOYSA-N
- SMILES: [Zn]=O

Properties
Chemical formula	ZnO
Molar mass	81.406 g/mol
Appearance	White solid
Odor	Odorless
Density	5.6 g/cm^{3}
Melting point	1,974 °C (3,585 °F; 2,247 K) (decomposes)
Boiling point	2,360 °C (4,280 °F; 2,630 K) (decomposes)
Solubility in water	0.0004% (17.8°C)
Band gap	3.2 eV (direct)
Electron mobility	180 cm^{2}/(V·s)
Magnetic susceptibility (χ)	−27.2·10^{−6} cm^{3}/mol
Thermal conductivity	0.6 W/(cm·K)
Refractive index (n_{D})	n_{1}=2.013, n_{2}=2.029

Structure
Crystal structure	Wurtzite
Space group	C_{6v}^{4}-P6_{3}mc
Lattice constant	a = 3.2495 Å, c = 5.2069 Å
Formula units (Z)	2
Coordination geometry	Tetrahedral

Thermochemistry
Heat capacity (C)	40.3 J·K^{−1}mol^{−1}
Std molar entropy (S^{⦵}_{298})	43.65±0.40 J·K^{−1}mol^{−1}
Std enthalpy of formation (Δ_{f}H^{⦵}_{298})	−350.46±0.27 kJ mol^{−1}
Gibbs free energy (Δ_{f}G^{⦵})	−320.5 kJ mol^{−1}
Enthalpy of fusion (Δ_{f}H^{⦵}_{fus})	70 kJ/mol

Pharmacology
ATCvet code	QA07XA91 (WHO)

Hazards
- GHS labelling
Pictograms	(GHS09: Environmental hazard)
Signal word	Warning
Hazard statements	H400, H401
Precautionary statements	P273, P391, P501
NFPA 704 (fire diamond)	2 0 0
Flash point	1,436 °C (2,617 °F; 1,709 K)
- Lethal dose or concentration (LD, LC)
LD_{50} (median dose)	240 mg/kg (intraperitoneal, rat); 7950 mg/kg (rat, oral)
LC_{50} (median concentration)	2500 mg/m^{3} (mouse)
LC_{Lo} (lowest published)	2500 mg/m^{3} (guinea pig, 3–4 h)
- NIOSH (US health exposure limits)
PEL (Permissible)	TWA 5 mg/m^{3} (fume) TWA 15 mg/m^{3} (total dust) TWA 5 mg/m^{3} (resp dust)
REL (Recommended)	Dust: TWA 5 mg/m^{3} C 15 mg/m^{3} Fume: TWA 5 mg/m^{3} ST 10 mg/m^{3}
IDLH (Immediate danger)	500 mg/m^{3}
Safety data sheet (SDS)	ICSC 0208

Related compounds
Other anions	Zinc sulfide Zinc selenide Zinc telluride
Other cations	Cadmium oxide Mercury(II) oxide
- Except where otherwise noted, data are given for materials in their standard state (at 25 °C [77 °F], 100 kPa). verify (what is ?) Infobox references

Zinc oxide is an inorganic compound with the formula ZnO. It is a white powder which is insoluble in water. ZnO is used as an additive in numerous materials and products including cosmetics, food supplements, rubbers, plastics, ceramics, glass, cement, lubricants, paints, sunscreens, ointments, calamine, adhesives, sealants, pigments, foods, batteries, ferrites, fire retardants, semi conductors, and first-aid tapes. Although it occurs naturally as the mineral zincite, most zinc oxide is produced synthetically.

== History ==
Early humans probably used zinc compounds in processed and unprocessed forms, as paint or medicinal ointment; however, their composition is uncertain. The use of pushpanjan, probably zinc oxide, as a salve for eyes and open wounds is mentioned in the Indian medical text the Charaka Samhita, thought to date from 500 BC or before. Zinc oxide ointment is also mentioned by the Greek physician Dioscorides (1st century AD). Galen suggested treating ulcerating cancers with zinc oxide, as did Avicenna in his The Canon of Medicine. It is used as an ingredient in products such as baby powder and creams against diaper rashes, calamine cream, anti-dandruff shampoos, and antiseptic ointments.

The Romans produced considerable quantities of brass (an alloy of zinc and copper) as early as 200 BC by a cementation process where copper was reacted with zinc oxide. The zinc oxide is thought to have been produced by heating zinc ore in a shaft furnace. This liberated metallic zinc as a vapor, which then ascended the flue and condensed as the oxide. This process was described by Dioscorides in the 1st century AD. Zinc oxide has also been recovered from zinc mines at Zawar in India, dating from the second half of the first millennium BC.

From the 12th to the 16th century, zinc and zinc oxide were recognized and produced in India using a primitive form of the direct synthesis process. From India, zinc manufacturing moved to China in the 17th century. In 1743, the first European zinc smelter was established in Bristol, United Kingdom. Around 1782, Louis-Bernard Guyton de Morveau proposed replacing lead white pigment with zinc oxide.

The main usage of zinc oxide (zinc white) was in paints and as an additive to ointments. Zinc white was accepted as a pigment in oil paintings by 1834 but it did not mix well with oil. This problem was solved by optimizing the synthesis of ZnO. In 1845, Edme-Jean Leclaire in Paris was producing the oil paint on a large scale; by 1850, zinc white was being manufactured throughout Europe. The success of zinc white paint was due to its advantages over the traditional white lead: zinc white is essentially permanent in sunlight, it is not blackened by sulfur-bearing air, it is non-toxic and more economical. Because zinc white is so "clean" it is valuable for making tints with other colors, but it makes a rather brittle dry film when unmixed with other colors. For example, during the late 1890s and early 1900s, some artists used zinc white as a ground for their oil paintings. These paintings developed cracks over time.

In recent times, most zinc oxide has been used in the rubber industry to resist corrosion. In the 1970s, the second largest application of ZnO was photocopying. High-quality ZnO produced by the "French process" was added to photocopying paper as a filler due to its properties as a semiconductor. Normal paper later supplanted the use of zinc oxide-coated paper in large-scale operations.

== Chemical properties ==
Pure ZnO is a white powder. However, in nature, it occurs as the rare mineral zincite, which usually contains manganese and other impurities that confer a yellow to red color.

Crystalline zinc oxide is thermochromic, changing from white to yellow when heated in air and reverting to white on cooling. This color change is caused by a small loss of oxygen to the environment at high temperatures to form the non-stoichiometric Zn_{1+x}O, where at 800 °C, x = 0.00007.

Zinc oxide is an amphoteric oxide. It is nearly insoluble in water, but it will dissolve in most acids, such as hydrochloric acid:

ZnO + 2 HCl → ZnCl_{2} + H_{2}O

Solid zinc oxide will also dissolve in alkalis to give soluble zincates:

ZnO + 2 NaOH + H_{2}O → Na_{2}[Zn(OH)_{4}]

ZnO reacts slowly with fatty acids in oils to produce the corresponding carboxylates, such as oleate or stearate. When mixed with a strong aqueous solution of zinc chloride, ZnO forms cement-like products best described as zinc hydroxy chlorides. This cement was used in dentistry.

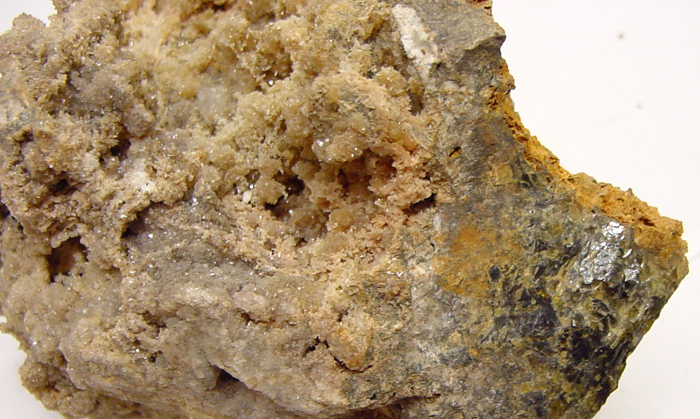
Hopeite

ZnO also forms cement-like material when treated with phosphoric acid; related materials are used in dentistry. A major component of zinc phosphate cement produced by this reaction is hopeite, Zn_{3}(PO_{4})_{2}·4H_{2}O.

ZnO decomposes into zinc vapor and oxygen at around 1975 °C with a standard oxygen pressure. In a carbothermic reaction, heating with carbon converts the oxide into zinc vapor at a much lower temperature (around 950 °C).

ZnO + C → Zn_{(Vapor)} + CO

== Physical properties ==
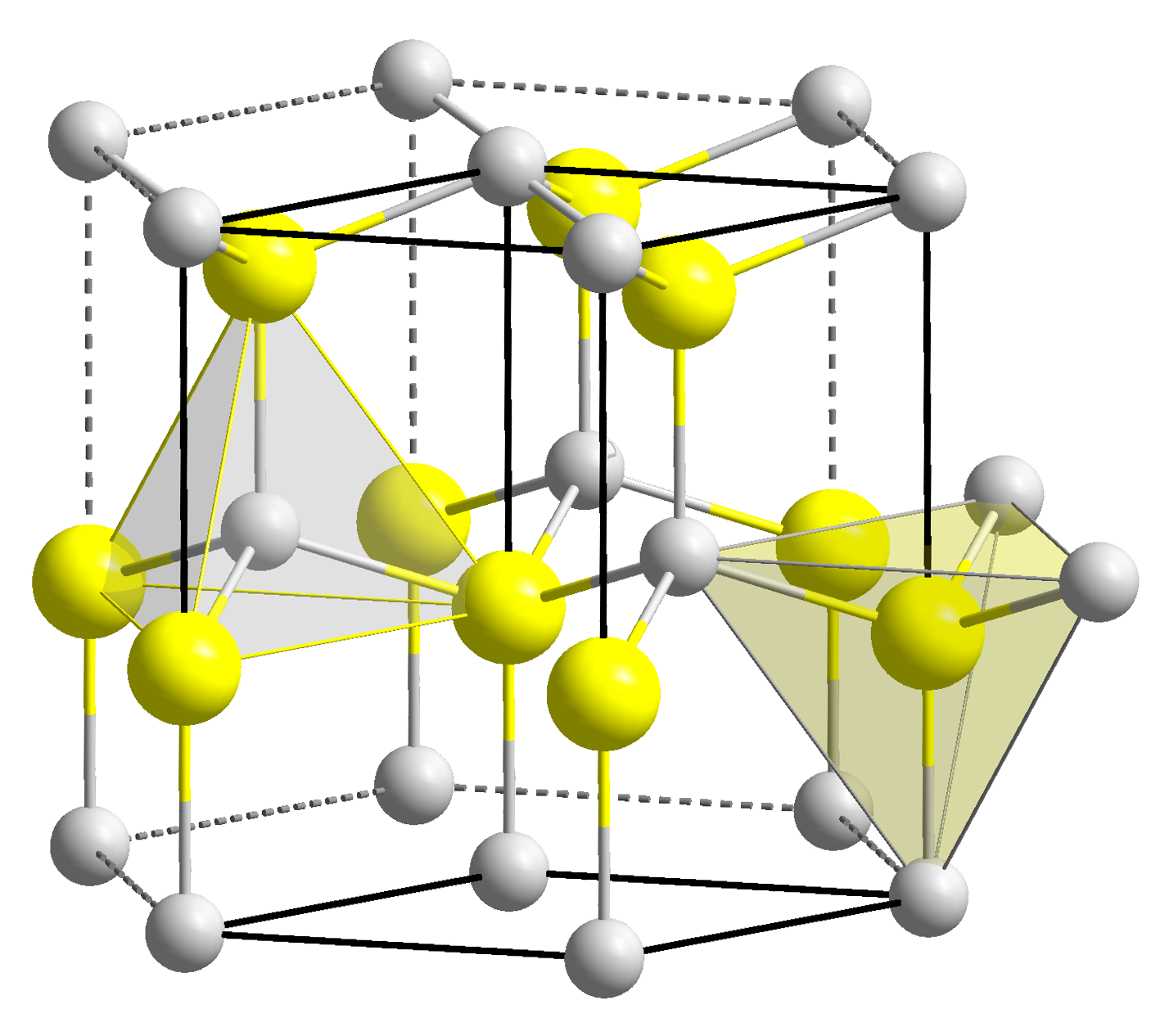
Wurtzite structure

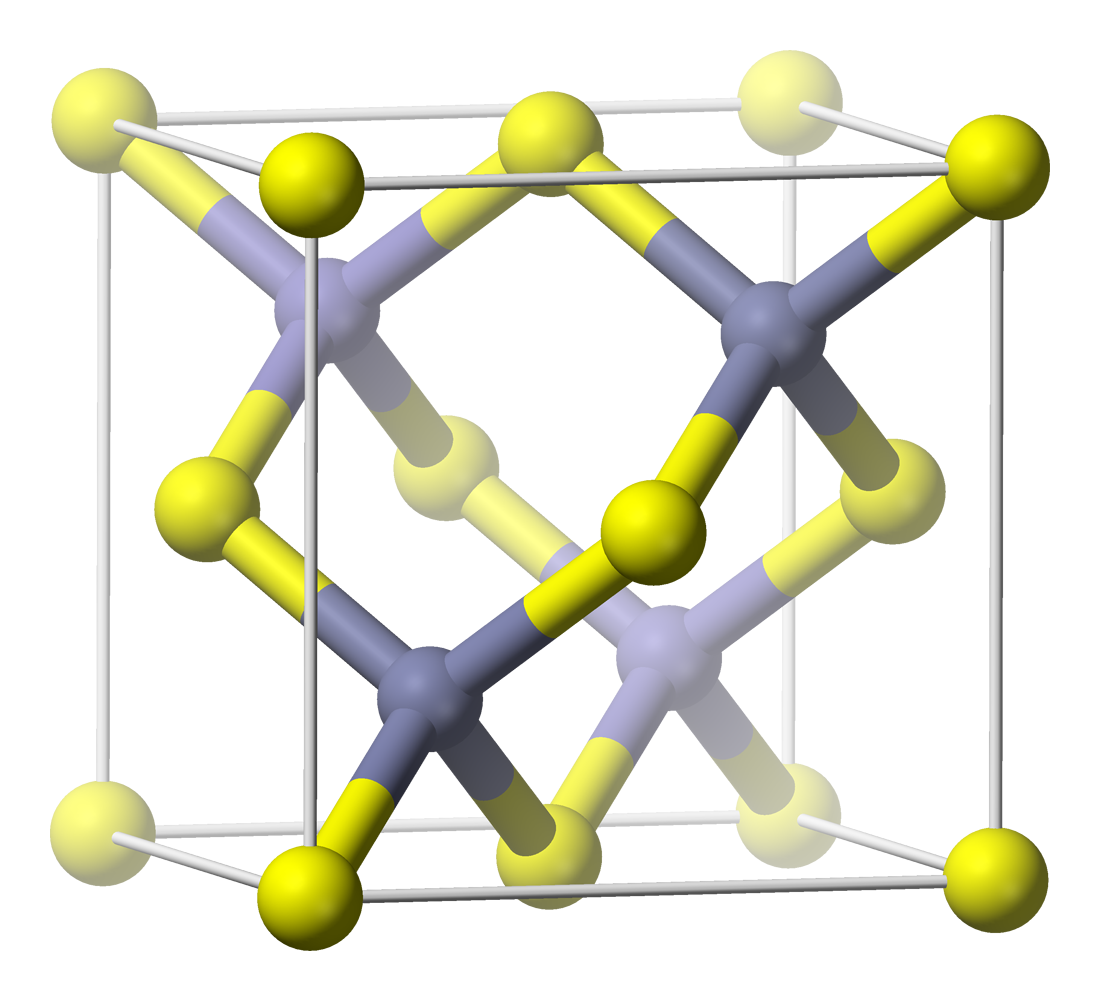
A zincblende unit cell

=== Structure ===
Zinc oxide crystallizes in two main forms, hexagonal wurtzite and cubic zincblende. The wurtzite structure is most stable at ambient conditions and thus most common. The zincblende form can be stabilized by growing ZnO on substrates with cubic lattice structure. In both cases, the zinc and oxide centers are tetrahedral, the most characteristic geometry for Zn(II). ZnO converts to the rocksalt motif at relatively high pressures about 10 GPa.

Hexagonal and zincblende polymorphs have no inversion symmetry (reflection of a crystal relative to any given point does not transform it into itself). This and other lattice symmetry properties result in piezoelectricity of the hexagonal and zincblende ZnO, and pyroelectricity of hexagonal ZnO.

The hexagonal structure has a point group 6 mm (Hermann–Mauguin notation) or C_{6v} (Schoenflies notation), and the space group is P6_{3}mc or C_{6v}^{4}. The lattice constants are a = 3.25 Å and c = 5.2 Å; their ratio c/a ~ 1.60 is close to the ideal value for hexagonal cell c/a = 1.633. As in most group II-VI materials, the bonding in ZnO is largely ionic (Zn^{2+}O^{2−}) with the corresponding radii of 0.074 nm for Zn^{2+} and 0.140 nm for O^{2−}. This property accounts for the preferential formation of wurtzite rather than zinc blende structure, as well as the strong piezoelectricity of ZnO. Because of the polar Zn−O bonds, zinc and oxygen planes are electrically charged. To maintain electrical neutrality, those planes reconstruct at atomic level in most relative materials, but not in ZnO – its surfaces are atomically flat, stable and exhibit no reconstruction. However, studies using wurtzoid structures explained the origin of surface flatness and the absence of reconstruction at ZnO wurtzite surfaces in addition to the origin of charges on ZnO planes.

=== Mechanical properties ===
ZnO is a relatively soft material with approximate hardness of 4.5 on the Mohs scale. Its elastic constants are smaller than those of relevant III-V semiconductors, such as GaN. The high heat capacity and heat conductivity, low thermal expansion and high melting temperature of ZnO are beneficial for ceramics. The E2 optical phonon in ZnO exhibits an unusually long lifetime of 133 ps at 10 K.

Among the tetrahedrally bonded semiconductors, it has been stated that ZnO has the highest piezoelectric tensor, or at least one comparable to that of GaN and AlN. This property makes it a technologically important material for many piezoelectrical applications, which require a large electromechanical coupling. Therefore, ZnO in the form of thin film has been one of the most studied and used resonator materials for thin-film bulk acoustic resonators.

=== Electronic and optical properties ===
Favourable properties of zinc oxide include good transparency, high electron mobility, wide band gap, and strong room-temperature luminescence. Those properties make ZnO valuable for a variety of emerging applications: transparent electrodes in liquid crystal displays, energy-saving or heat-protecting windows, and electronics as thin-film transistors and light-emitting diodes.

ZnO is a semiconductor of the II-VI semiconductor group and it has a relatively wide direct band gap of ~3.3 eV at room temperature. Advantages associated with a wide band gap include higher breakdown voltages, ability to sustain large electric fields, lower electronic noise, and high-temperature and high-power operation. The band gap of ZnO can further be tuned to ~3–4 eV by its alloying with magnesium oxide or cadmium oxide. Due to this large band gap, there have been efforts to create visibly transparent solar cells utilising ZnO as a light absorbing layer. However, these solar cells have so far proven highly inefficient.

Most ZnO has n-type character, even in the absence of intentional doping. Nonstoichiometry is typically the origin of this n-type character, but the subject remains controversial. An alternative explanation has been proposed, based on theoretical calculations, that unintentional substitutional hydrogen impurities are responsible. Controllable n-type doping is easily achieved by substituting Zn with group-III elements such as Al, Ga, In or by substituting oxygen with group-VII elements chlorine or iodine.

Reliable p-type doping of ZnO remains difficult. This problem originates from low solubility of p-type dopants and their compensation by abundant n-type impurities. This problem is observed with GaN and ZnSe. Measurement of p-type in "intrinsically" n-type material is complicated by the inhomogeneity of samples.

Current limitations to p-doping limit electronic and optoelectronic applications of ZnO, which usually require junctions of n-type and p-type material. Known p-type dopants include group-I elements Li, Na, K; group-V elements N, P and As; as well as copper and silver. However, many of these form deep acceptors and do not produce significant p-type conduction at room temperature.

Electron mobility of ZnO strongly varies with temperature and has a maximum of ~2000 cm^{2}/(V·s) at 80 K. Data on hole mobility are scarce with values in the range 5–30 cm^{2}/(V·s).

ZnO discs, acting as a varistor, are the active material in most surge arresters.

Zinc oxide is noted for its strongly nonlinear optical properties, especially in bulk. The nonlinearity of ZnO nanoparticles can be fine-tuned according to their size.

== Production ==
For industrial use, ZnO is produced at levels of 10^{5} tons per year by three main processes:

=== Indirect process ===
In the indirect or French process, metallic zinc is melted in a graphite crucible and vaporized at temperatures above 907 °C (typically around 1000 °C). Zinc vapor reacts with the oxygen in the air to give ZnO, accompanied by a drop in its temperature and bright luminescence. Zinc oxide particles are transported into a cooling duct and collected in a bag house. This indirect method was popularized by Edme Jean LeClaire of Paris in 1844 and therefore is commonly known as the French process. Its product normally consists of agglomerated zinc oxide particles with an average size of 0.1 to a few micrometers. By weight, most of the world's zinc oxide is manufactured via French process.

=== Direct process ===
The direct or American process starts with diverse contaminated zinc composites, such as zinc ores or smelter by-products. The zinc precursors are reduced (carbothermal reduction) by heating with a source of carbon such as anthracite to produce zinc vapor, which is then oxidized as in the indirect process. Because of the lower purity of the source material, the final product is also of lower quality in the direct process as compared to the indirect one.

=== Wet chemical process ===
A small amount of industrial production involves wet chemical processes, which start with aqueous solutions of zinc salts, from which zinc carbonate or zinc hydroxide is precipitated. The solid precipitate is then calcined at temperatures around 800 °C.

=== Laboratory synthesis ===
The red and green colors of these synthetic ZnO crystals result from different concentrations of oxygen vacancies.

Numerous specialised methods exist for producing ZnO for scientific studies and niche applications. These methods can be classified by the resulting ZnO form (bulk, thin film, nanowire), temperature ("low", that is close to room temperature or "high", that is T ~ 1000 °C), process type (vapor deposition or growth from solution) and other parameters.

Large single crystals (many cubic centimeters) can be grown by the gas transport (vapor-phase deposition), hydrothermal synthesis, or melt growth. However, because of the high vapor pressure of ZnO, growth from the melt is problematic. Growth by gas transport is difficult to control, leaving the hydrothermal method as a preference. Thin films can be produced by a variety of methods including chemical vapor deposition, metalorganic vapour phase epitaxy, electrodeposition, sputtering, spray pyrolysis, thermal oxidation, sol–gel synthesis, atomic layer deposition, and pulsed laser deposition.

Zinc oxide can be produced in bulk by precipitation from zinc compounds, mainly zinc acetate, in various solutions, such as aqueous sodium hydroxide or aqueous ammonium carbonate. Synthetic methods characterized in literature since the year 2000 aim to produce ZnO particles with high surface area and minimal size distribution, including precipitation, mechanochemical, sol-gel, microwave, and emulsion methods.

=== ZnO nanostructures ===
Nanostructures of ZnO can be synthesized into a variety of morphologies, including nanowires, nanorods, tetrapods, nanobelts, nanoflowers, nanoparticles, etc. Nanostructures can be obtained with most above-mentioned techniques, at certain conditions, and also with the vapor–liquid–solid method. The synthesis is typically carried out at temperatures of about 90 °C, in an equimolar aqueous solution of zinc nitrate and hexamine, the latter providing the basic environment. Certain additives, such as polyethylene glycol or polyethylenimine, can improve the aspect ratio of the ZnO nanowires. Doping of the ZnO nanowires has been achieved by adding other metal nitrates to the growth solution. The morphology of the resulting nanostructures can be tuned by changing the parameters relating to the precursor composition (such as the zinc concentration and pH) or to the thermal treatment (such as the temperature and heating rate).

Aligned ZnO nanowires on pre-seeded silicon, glass, and gallium nitride substrates have been grown using aqueous zinc salts such as zinc nitrate and zinc acetate in basic environments. Pre-seeding substrates with ZnO creates sites for homogeneous nucleation of ZnO crystal during the synthesis. Common pre-seeding methods include in-situ thermal decomposition of zinc acetate crystallites, spin coating of ZnO nanoparticles, and the use of physical vapor deposition methods to deposit ZnO thin films. Pre-seeding can be performed in conjunction with top down patterning methods such as electron beam lithography and nanosphere lithography to designate nucleation sites prior to growth. Aligned ZnO nanowires can be used in dye-sensitized solar cells and field emission devices.

== Applications ==
The applications of zinc oxide powder are numerous, and the principal ones are summarized below. Most applications exploit the reactivity of the oxide as a precursor to other zinc compounds. For material science applications, zinc oxide has high refractive index, high thermal conductivity, binding, antibacterial and UV-protection properties. Consequently, it is added into materials and products including plastics, ceramics, glass, cement, rubber, lubricants, paints, ointments, adhesive, sealants, concrete manufacturing, pigments, foods, batteries, ferrites, and fire retardants.

=== Rubber industry ===
Between 50% and 60% of ZnO use is in the rubber industry. Zinc oxide along with stearic acid is used in the sulfur vulcanization of rubber. ZnO additives in the form of nanoparticles are used in rubber as a pigment and to enhance its durability, and have been used in composite rubber materials such as those based on montmorillonite to impart germicidal properties.

=== Ceramic industry ===
Ceramic industry consumes a significant amount of zinc oxide, in particular in ceramic glaze and frit compositions. The relatively high heat capacity, thermal conductivity and high temperature stability of ZnO coupled with a comparatively low coefficient of expansion are desirable properties in the production of ceramics. ZnO affects the melting point and optical properties of the glazes, enamels, and ceramic formulations. Zinc oxide as a low expansion, secondary flux improves the elasticity of glazes by reducing the change in viscosity as a function of temperature and helps prevent crazing and shivering. By substituting ZnO for BaO and PbO, the heat capacity is decreased and the thermal conductivity is increased. Zinc in small amounts improves the development of glossy and brilliant surfaces. However, in moderate to high amounts, it produces matte and crystalline surfaces. With regard to color, zinc has a complicated influence.

=== Medicine ===
==== Skin treatment ====
Zinc oxide as a mixture with about 0.5% iron(III) oxide (Fe_{2}O_{3}) is called calamine and is used in calamine lotion, a topical skin treatment. Historically, the name calamine was ascribed to a mineral that contained zinc used in powdered form as medicine, but it was determined in 1803 that ore described as calamine was actually a mixture of the zinc minerals smithsonite and hemimorphite.

Zinc oxide is widely used to treat a variety of skin conditions, including atopic dermatitis, contact dermatitis, itching due to eczema, diaper rash and acne. It is used in products such as baby powder and barrier creams to treat diaper rashes, calamine cream, anti-dandruff shampoos, and antiseptic ointments. It is often combined with castor oil to form an emollient and astringent, zinc and castor oil cream, commonly used to treat infants.

It is also a component in tape (called "zinc oxide tape") used by athletes as a bandage to prevent soft tissue damage during workouts.

==== Antibacterial ====
Zinc oxide is used in mouthwash products and toothpastes as an anti-bacterial agent proposed to prevent plaque and tartar formation, and to control bad breath by reducing the volatile gases and volatile sulfur compounds (VSC) in the mouth. Along with zinc oxide or zinc salts, these products also commonly contain other active ingredients, such as cetylpyridinium chloride, xylitol, hinokitiol, essential oils and plant extracts. Powdered zinc oxide has deodorizing and antibacterial properties.

ZnO is added to cotton fabric, rubber, oral care products, and food packaging. Enhanced antibacterial action of fine particles compared to bulk material is not exclusive to ZnO and is observed for other materials, such as silver. The mechanism of ZnO's antibacterial effect has been variously described as the generation of reactive oxygen species, the release of Zn^{2+} ions, and a general disturbance of the bacterial cell membrane by nanoparticles.

==== Sunscreen ====
Zinc oxide is used in sunscreen to absorb ultraviolet light. It is the broadest spectrum UVA and UVB absorber that is approved for use as a sunscreen by the U.S. Food and Drug Administration (FDA), and is completely photostable. When used as an ingredient in sunscreen, zinc oxide blocks both UVA (320–400 nm) and UVB (280–320 nm) rays of ultraviolet light. Zinc oxide and the other most common physical sunscreen, titanium dioxide, are considered to be nonirritating, nonallergenic, and non-comedogenic. Zinc from zinc oxide is, however, slightly absorbed into the skin.

Many sunscreens use nanoparticles of zinc oxide (along with nanoparticles of titanium dioxide) because such small particles do not scatter light and therefore do not appear white. The nanoparticles are not absorbed into the skin more than regular-sized zinc oxide particles are and are only absorbed into the outermost layer of the skin but not into the body.

==== Dental restoration ====
When mixed with eugenol, zinc oxide eugenol is formed, which has applications as a restorative and prosthodontic in dentistry.

=== Food additive ===
Zinc oxide is added to many food products, including breakfast cereals, as a source of zinc, a necessary nutrient. Zinc may be added to food in the form of zinc oxide nanoparticles, or as zinc sulfate, zinc gluconate, zinc acetate, or zinc citrate. Some foods also include trace amounts of ZnO even if it is not intended as a nutrient.

=== Pigment ===
Zinc oxide (zinc white) is used as a pigment in paints and is more opaque than lithopone, but less opaque than titanium dioxide. It is also used in coatings for paper. Chinese white is a special grade of zinc white used in artists' pigments. The use of zinc white as a pigment in oil painting started in the middle of 18th century. It has partly replaced the poisonous lead white and was used by painters such as Böcklin, Van Gogh, Manet, Munch and others, though it is being phased out by some artists paint manufacturers because of its tendency to form brittle and unstable paint films in oils. It is also a main ingredient of mineral makeup (CI 77947).

=== UV absorber ===
Micronized and nano-scale zinc oxide provides strong protection against UVA and UVB ultraviolet radiation, and are consequently used in sunscreens, and also in UV-blocking sunglasses for use in space and for protection when welding, following research by scientists at Jet Propulsion Laboratory (JPL).

=== Coatings ===
Paints containing zinc oxide powder have long been utilized as anticorrosive coatings for metals. They are especially effective for galvanized iron. Iron is difficult to protect because its reactivity with organic coatings leads to brittleness and lack of adhesion. Zinc oxide paints retain their flexibility and adherence on such surfaces for many years.

ZnO highly n-type doped with aluminium, gallium, or indium is transparent and conductive (transparency ~90%, lowest resistivity ~10^{−4} Ω·cm). ZnO:Al coatings are used for energy-saving or heat-protecting windows. The coating lets the visible part of the spectrum in but either reflects the infrared (IR) radiation back into the room (energy saving) or does not let the IR radiation into the room (heat protection), depending on which side of the window has the coating.

Plastics, such as polyethylene naphthalate (PEN), can be protected by applying zinc oxide coating. The coating reduces the diffusion of oxygen through PEN. Zinc oxide layers can also be used on polycarbonate in outdoor applications. The coating protects polycarbonate from solar radiation, and decreases its oxidation rate and photo-yellowing.

=== Corrosion prevention in nuclear reactors ===
Zinc oxide depleted in ^{64}Zn (the zinc isotope with atomic mass 64) is used in corrosion prevention in nuclear pressurized water reactors. The depletion is necessary, because ^{64}Zn is transformed into radioactive ^{65}Zn under irradiation by the reactor neutrons.

=== Methane reforming ===
Zinc oxide (ZnO) is used as a pretreatment step to remove hydrogen sulfide (H_{2}S) from natural gas following hydrogenation of any sulfur compounds prior to a methane reformer, which can poison the catalyst. At temperatures between about 230–430 °C (446–806 °F), H_{2}S is converted to water by the following reaction:

H_{2}S + ZnO → H_{2}O + ZnS

=== Electronics ===
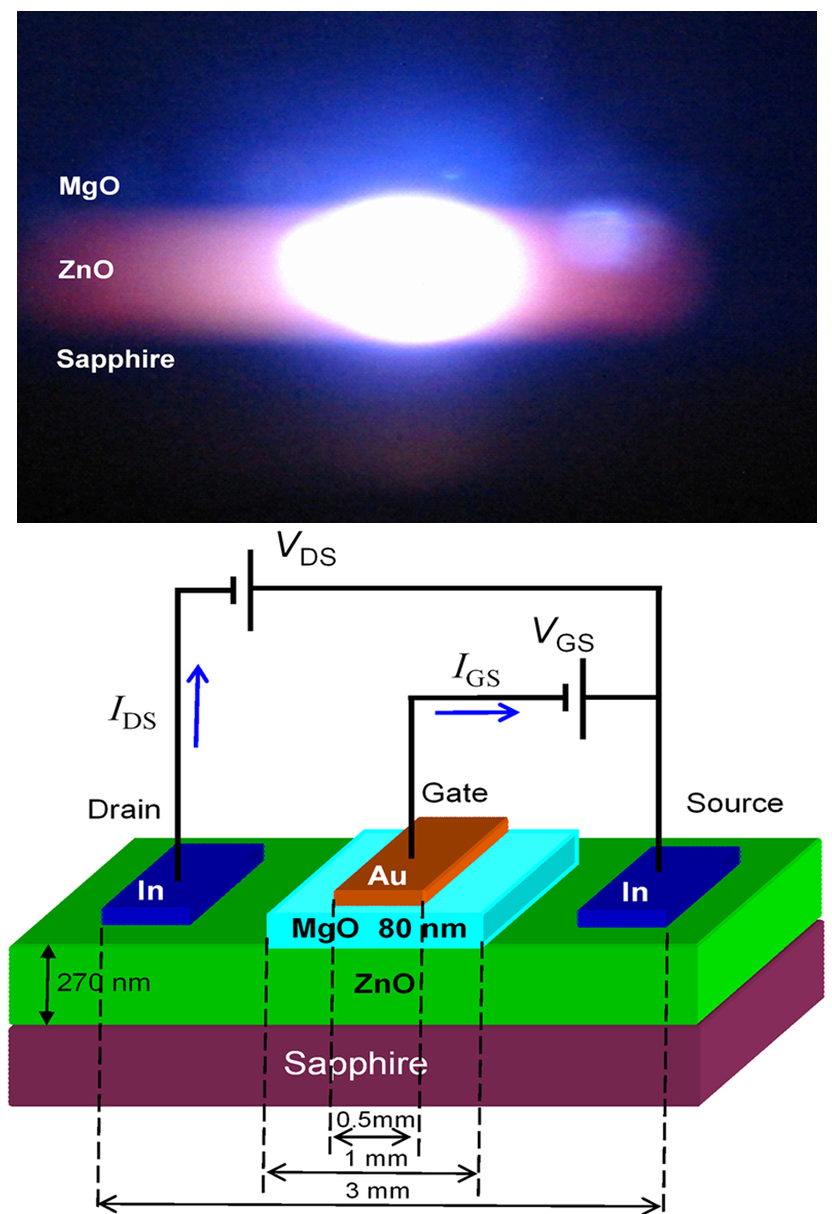
Photograph of an operating ZnO UV laser diode and the corresponding device structure.

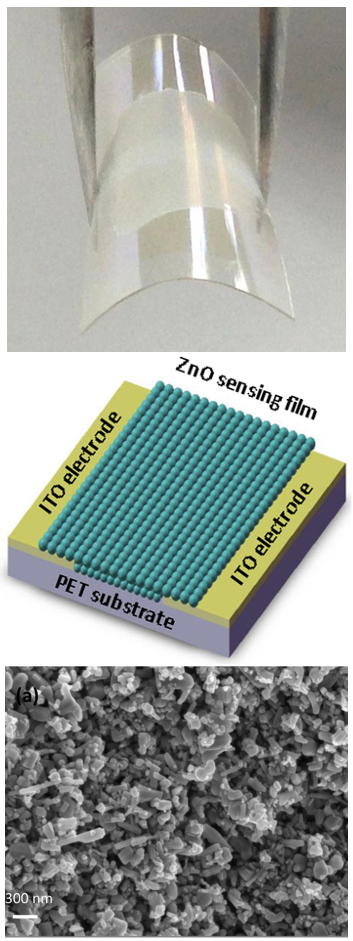
Flexible gas sensor based on ZnO nanorods and its internal structure. ITO stands for indium tin oxide and PET for polyethylene terephthalate.

ZnO has wide direct band gap (3.37 eV or 375 nm at room temperature). Therefore, its most common potential applications are in laser diodes and light emitting diodes (LEDs). Moreover, ultrafast nonlinearities and photoconductive functions have been reported in ZnO. Some optoelectronic applications of ZnO overlap with that of GaN, which has a similar band gap (~3.4 eV at room temperature). Compared to GaN, ZnO has a larger exciton binding energy (~60 meV, 2.4 times of the room-temperature thermal energy), which results in bright room-temperature emission from ZnO. ZnO can be combined with GaN for LED-applications. For instance, a transparent conducting oxide layer and ZnO nanostructures provide better light outcoupling. Other properties of ZnO favorable for electronic applications include its stability to high-energy radiation and its ability to be patterned by wet chemical etching. Radiation resistance makes ZnO a suitable candidate for space applications. Nanostructured ZnO is an effective medium both in powder and polycrystalline forms in random lasers, due to its high refractive index and aforementioned light emission properties.

=== Gas sensors ===
Zinc oxide is used in semiconductor gas sensors for detecting airborne compounds such as hydrogen sulfide, nitrogen dioxide, and volatile organic compounds. ZnO is a semiconductor that becomes n-doped by adsorption of reducing compounds, which reduces the detected electrical resistance through the device, in a manner similar to the widely used tin oxide semiconductor gas sensors. It is formed into nanostructures such as thin films, nanoparticles, nanopillars, or nanowires to provide a large surface area for interaction with gases. The sensors are made selective for specific gases by doping or surface-attaching materials such as catalytic noble metals.

== Aspirational applications ==
=== Transparent electrodes ===
Aluminium-doped ZnO layers are used as transparent electrodes. The components Zn and Al are much cheaper and less toxic than the commonly used indium tin oxide (ITO). One emergent commercial application is the use of ZnO as the front contact for solar cells and liquid crystal displays.

Transparent thin-film transistors (TTFT) can be produced with ZnO. As field-effect transistors, they do not need a p–n junction, thus avoiding the p-type doping problem of ZnO. Some of the field-effect transistors even use ZnO nanorods as conducting channels.

=== Piezoelectricity ===
The piezoelectricity in textile fibers coated in ZnO have been shown capable of fabricating "self-powered nanosystems" with everyday mechanical stress from wind or body movements.

=== Photocatalysis ===
ZnO, both in macro- and nano- scales, could in principle be used as an electrode in photocatalysis, mainly as an anode in green chemistry applications. As a photocatalyst, ZnO reacts when exposed to UV radiation and is used in photodegradation reactions to remove organic pollutants from the environment. It is also used to replace catalysts used in photochemical reactions that would ordinarily require costly or inconvenient reaction conditions with low yields.

=== Other ===
The pointed tips of ZnO nanorods could be used as field emitters.

ZnO is a promising anode material for lithium-ion battery because it is cheap, biocompatible, and environmentally friendly. ZnO has a higher theoretical capacity (978 mAh g^{−1}) than many other transition metal oxides such as CoO (715 mAh g^{−1}), NiO (718 mAh g^{−1}) and CuO (674 mAh g^{−1}). ZnO is also used as an electrode in supercapacitors.

== Safety ==
As a food additive, zinc oxide is on the U.S. Food and Drug Administration's list of generally recognized as safe substances.

Zinc oxide itself is non-toxic; it is hazardous, however, to inhale high concentrations of zinc oxide fumes, such as those generated when zinc or zinc alloys are melted and oxidized at high temperature. This problem occurs while melting alloys containing brass because the melting point of brass is close to the boiling point of zinc. Inhalation of zinc oxide, which may occur when welding galvanized (zinc-plated) steel, can result in a malady called metal fume fever.

In sunscreen formulations that combined zinc oxide with small-molecule UV absorbers, UV light caused photodegradation of the small-molecule absorbers and toxicity in embryonic zebrafish assays.

== See also ==
- Depleted zinc oxide – Chemical compound
- Zinc oxide nanoparticle
- Gallium(III) nitride – Chemical semiconductor compound
- List of inorganic pigments
- Zinc
- Zinc oxide eugenol – Dental cement material
- Zinc peroxide
- Zinc smelting – Conversion of zinc ore into pure zinc
- Zinc–air battery – High-energy-density electrical storage device
- Zinc–zinc oxide cycle
- ZnO nanostructures

== Cited sources ==
- Haynes, William M., ed. (2016). CRC Handbook of Chemistry and Physics (97th ed.). CRC Press. ISBN 978-1-4987-5429-3.

== Reviews ==
- Özgür Ü, Alivov YI, Liu C, Teke A, Reshchikov M, Doğan S, et al. (2005). "A comprehensive review of ZnO materials and devices". Journal of Applied Physics. 98 (4) 041301: 041301–041301–103. Bibcode:2005JAP....98d1301O. doi:10.1063/1.1992666.
- Bakin A, Waag A (29 March 2011). "ZnO Epitaxial Growth". In Bhattacharya P, Fornari R, Kamimura H (eds.). Comprehensive Semiconductor Science and Technology 6 Volume Encyclopaedia. Elsevier. ISBN 978-0-444-53143-8.
- Baruah S, Dutta J (February 2009). "Hydrothermal growth of ZnO nanostructures". Science and Technology of Advanced Materials. 10 (1) 013001. Bibcode:2009STAdM..10a3001B. doi:10.1088/1468-6996/10/1/013001. PMC 5109597. PMID 27877250.
- Janisch R (2005). "Transition metal-doped TiO 2 and ZnO—present status of the field". Journal of Physics: Condensed Matter. 17 (27): R657–R689. Bibcode:2005JPCM...17R.657J. doi:10.1088/0953-8984/17/27/R01. S2CID 118610509.
- Heo YW (2004). "ZnO nanowire growth and devices". Materials Science and Engineering: R: Reports. 47 (1–2): 1–47. Bibcode:2004MSEnR..47....1H. doi:10.1016/j.mser.2004.09.001.
- Klingshirn C (2007). "ZnO: From basics towards applications". Physica Status Solidi B. 244 (9): 3027–3073. Bibcode:2007PSSBR.244.3027K. doi:10.1002/pssb.200743072. S2CID 97461963.
- Klingshirn C (April 2007). "ZnO: material, physics and applications". ChemPhysChem. 8 (6): 782–803. doi:10.1002/cphc.200700002. PMID 17429819.
- Lu JG, Chang P, Fan Z (2006). "Quasi-one-dimensional metal oxide materials—Synthesis, properties and applications". Materials Science and Engineering: R: Reports. 52 (1–3): 49–91. Bibcode:2006MSEnR..52...49L. doi:10.1016/j.mser.2006.04.002.
- Xu S, Wang ZL (2011). "One-dimensional ZnO nanostructures: Solution growth and functional properties". Nano Research. 4 (11): 1013–1098. doi:10.1007/s12274-011-0160-7. S2CID 137014543.
- Xu S, Wang ZL (2011). "Oxide nanowire arrays for light-emitting diodes and piezoelectric energy harvesters". Pure and Applied Chemistry. 83 (12): 2171–2198. Bibcode:2011PApCh..83.2171X. doi:10.1351/PAC-CON-11-08-17. S2CID 18770461.
