= Beilby Medal and Prize =

- Awarded for: Work of exceptional practical significance in chemical engineering, applied materials science, energy efficiency or a related field.
- Sponsored by: Royal Society of Chemistry
- Date: 1924
- Reward: £1,000
- Website: www.rsc.org/ScienceAndTechnology/Awards/Beilby/

The Beilby Medal and Prize is awarded annually to a scientist or engineer for work that has exceptional practical significance in chemical engineering, applied materials science, energy efficiency or a related field. The prize is jointly administered by the Institute of Materials, Minerals and Mining, the Royal Society of Chemistry and the Society of Chemical Industry, who make the award in rotation.

The award is open to members of the Institute of Materials, Minerals and Mining, the Royal Society of Chemistry and the Society of Chemical Industry as well as other scientists and engineers worldwide. The aim of the award is to recognise the achievements of early-career scientists, and nominees should be no older than 39 years of age.

The Beilby Medal and Prize is awarded in memory of Scottish scientist Sir George Thomas Beilby FRS. Born in 1850, he joined the Oakbank Oil Company in 1869 following his studies at the University of Edinburgh. He later became President of all three organisations or their precursor societies, acting as President of the Society of Chemical Industry from 1898–99, The Institute of Chemistry from 1902–12 and the Institute of Metals from 1916–18.

Recipients of the award receive a medal, a certificate and a prize of £1,000. The first award was made in 1930.

== Recipients ==
The Beilby Medal and Prize recipients since 1930 are:

- 2026 – Han Zhang
- 2025 – Alexandra Patterson
- 2024 – Robert Hoye
- 2023 – Charlotte Vogt
- 2022 – Sahika Inal
- 2021 – Pola Goldberg Oppenheimer
- 2020 – Jin Xuan
- 2019 – Prashant K. Jain
- 2018 – Gregg Beckham
- 2017 – Ken-Tye Yong
- 2016 – Sarbajit Banerjee
- 2015 – Benjamin Wiley
- 2014 – Javier Pérez-Ramírez
- 2013 – Xiangfeng Duan
- 2012 – Adam F. Lee
- 2011 – Samuel Kingman (engineer)
- 2010 – Suwan Jayasinghe
- 2009 – Zhenan Bao
- 2008 – Neil McKeown
- 2007 – Ifor D. W. Samuel
- 2006 – Markus Kraft
- 2005 – Simon R. Biggs, Nilay Shah
- 2004 – Ivan P. Parkin
- 2003 – Peter Bruce
- 2002 – No award
- 2001 – Alfred Cerezo
- 2000 – Zheng Xiao Guo
- 1999 – John T. S. Irvine, Anthony J. Ryan
- 1998 – Costos C. Pantelides
- 1997 – Richard A. Williams
- 1996 – Paul J. Luckham
- 1995 – Lynn F. Gladden
- 1994 – Hans Müller-Steinhagen
- 1993 – Howard A. Chase, David C. Sherrington
- 1992 – R. C. Brown
- 1991 – Geoffrey J. Ashwell
- 1990 – R. F. Dalton
- 1989 – No award
- 1988 – No award
- 1987 – G. E. Thompson
- 1986 – Malcolm Robert Mackley
- 1985 – George D. W. Smith
- 1984 – A. Grint
- 1983 – Brian J. Briscoe
- 1981 – Derek John Fray, R. M. Nedderman
- 1980 – James Barrie Scuffham
- 1979 – Stephen F. Bush
- 1978 – John Christopher Scully
- 1977 – James E. Castle
- 1976 – Ian Fells
- 1975 – Peter Roland Swann
- 1973 – Julian Szekely, G. C. Wood
- 1972 – Frank Pearson Lees
- 1971 – John Howard Purnell
- 1970 – Albert R. C. Westwood
- 1969 – Raymond Edward Smallman
- 1968 – J. Mardon
- 1967 – Anthony Kelly
- 1966 – J. F. Davidson
- 1965 – J. A. Charles
- 1964 – Peter L. Pratt
- 1963 – Robert Honeycombe, R. W. B. Nurse
- 1961 – C. Edeleanu, John Nutting
- 1957 – B. E. Hopkins, Edmund C. Potter
- 1956 – R. W. Kear
- 1955 – F. D. Richardson, F. Wormwell
- 1954 – H. K. Hardy, Sir James Woodham Menter
- 1952 – T. V. Arden
- 1951 – Kenneth Henderson Jack, W. A. Wood
- 1950 – W. A. Baker, G. Whittingham
- 1949 – Frank R. N. Nabarro, C. E. Ransley, Keble Sykes
- 1948 – A. Stuart C. Lawrence
- 1947 – Geoffrey Vincent Raynor, G. R. Rigby
- 1940 – F. M. Lea
- 1938 – Frank Philip Bowden, B. Jones
- 1937 – Bernard Scott Evans, William Harold Juggins Vernon
- 1934 – William Hume-Rothery, E. A. Rudge
- 1933 – Constance Tipper, Arthur Joseph Victor Underwood
- 1932 – Walter James Rees, W. R. Schoeller
- 1930 – Guy Dunstan Bengough, Ulick Richardson Evans

== See also ==
- List of chemistry awards
- List of engineering awards
