= Javier Pérez-Ramírez =

Spanish chemical engineer

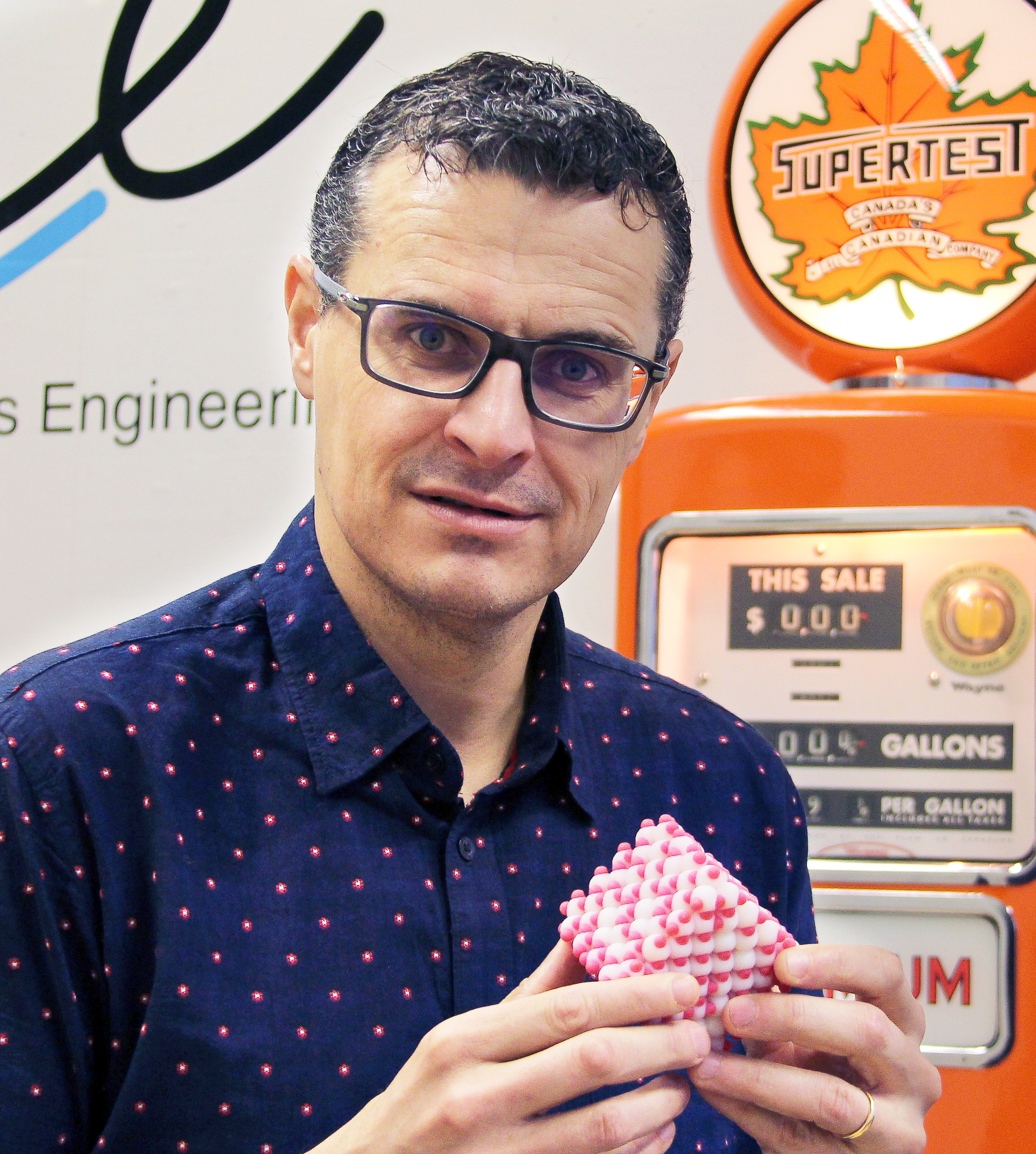
- Javier Pérez-Ramírez
- Born: October 28, 1974 (age 51); Benidorm, Spain
- Education: TU Delft
- Height: 1.98 m (6 ft 6 in)
- Scientific career
- Fields: Catalysis; Chemical Engineering; Materials Science
- Workplaces: ETH Zurich
- Website: www.ace.ethz.ch/en/jpr

Javier Pérez-Ramírez (born 28 October 1974) is a Professor of Catalysis and Chemical Engineering at ETH Zurich.

== Career ==
Javier Pérez-Ramírez (JPR) studied Chemical Engineering at the University of Alicante, and later obtained his PhD cum laude at TU Delft (2002). He worked for Norsk Hydro and Yara International and returned to academia as an ICREA research professor at the Institute of Chemical Research of Catalonia, related to the Rovira i Virgili University (2005-2009). Since 2010, he is Full Professor of Catalysis Engineering at the Institute for Chemical and Bioengineering at the Swiss Federal Institute of Technology Zurich. In 2018 he became visiting professor and director of the Flagship Green Energy Program at the National University of Singapore.

He is Editorial Board Chair of Green Chemistry, and sits on the editorial board of Advanced Functional Materials, Applied Catalysis B: Environmental, ACS Catalysis, Energy Technology, and Catalysis Communications.

Since 2018, Pérez-Ramírez is president of the Catalysis Section of the Swiss Chemical Society. He is Swiss representative of the European Federation of Catalysis. Since 2020, he directs NCCR Catalysis, a national center of competence in research funded by the Swiss National Science Foundation.

== Research ==
Pérez-Ramírez's central research focuses on the fundamental design and technical development of new heterogeneous catalysts and reactor engineering concepts, favoring the more efficient and sustainable manufacturing within the chemical industry. He has developed novel catalysts for the gas-phase oxidation of hydrogen chloride (Deacon process) and has done major and groundbreaking contributions in the rational design of hierarchical zeolites.

== Awards ==
Pérez-Ramírez's work of nearly 480 articles and 17 patents has been recognized by several major prizes, including the Paul H. Emmett Award in Fundamental Catalysis (2019), Xingda Lecturship of Peking University (2018), Sustainable Energy Award (2017), the Beilby Medal and Prize (2014), the EFCATS Young Researcher Award (2013), the DECHEMA Otto Roelen Medal (2012), the Andrew Main lectureship (2013), the UOP-Honeywell Invitational Lectureship (2012), and the KNCV Prijs voor Katalyse (2003).

In 2013, he has been elected Fellow of the Royal Society of Chemistry.
