= Howard Chase (chemical engineer) =

British academic and chemical engineer

Howard Allaker Chase
- Born: 17 November 1954 (age 71); London, England
- Education: University of Cambridge
- Awards: Donald Medal (2010); Beilby Medal and Prize (1993)
- Scientific career
- Fields: Chemical engineering
- Workplaces: University of Cambridge

Howard Allaker Chase is a British academic and chemical engineer. He is Head of the School of Technology and Professor of Biochemical Engineering at the University of Cambridge. From 1998 to 2006 he was Head of the Department of Chemical Engineering at the University of Cambridge. Chase has been a Fellow of the Royal Academy of Engineering since 2005. He is also a Fellow of the Institution of Chemical Engineers, a Member of the Royal Society of Chemistry, a Chartered Engineer, a Chartered Chemist, and a Chartered Scientist. In 2010 he was awarded the Donald Medal, an award of the Institution of Chemical Engineers, in recognition of his industrially related research in the field of bioseparations technology. Chase was an undergraduate (Natural Sciences Tripos), and a research student (biochemistry) at Magdalene College, Cambridge, between 1972 and 1978. He held a research fellowship at St John's College, Cambridge, from 1978 to 1982. In 1984 he was elected to a fellowship at Magdalene College, Cambridge where he became director of studies in chemical engineering. He was tutor for graduate students 1987–1994, tutor 1994-1996 and senior tutor 1993–1996.

He was awarded the Beilby Medal and Prize in 1993.
