= Green Chemistry (journal) =

- Discipline: Chemistry, chemical engineering
- Language: English
- Edited by: Javier Pérez-Ramírez

Publication details
- History: 1999-present
- Publisher: Royal Society of Chemistry (United Kingdom)
- Frequency: Monthly
- Impact factor: 9.3 (2023)

Standard abbreviations
- ISO 4: Green Chem.

Indexing
- CODEN: GRCHFJ
- ISSN: 1463-9262 (print); 1463-9270 (web)
- LCCN: sn99003788
- OCLC no.: 40966731

Links
- Journal homepage; Online access

Green Chemistry is a monthly peer-reviewed scientific journal covering every aspect of sustainable chemistry and its implementation in chemical engineering. It is published by the Royal Society of Chemistry and was established in 1999 by James Clark (University of York). Articles published in this journal are intended to be accessible to a wide audience. The editor-in-chief is Javier Pérez-Ramírez.

== Article types ==
- Research papers (which contain original scientific work that has not been published previously)
- Communications (original scientific work that is of an urgent nature and that has not been published previously)
- Green Chemistry news (an easy-to-read magazine style section)

== Abstracting and indexing ==
The journal is abstracted and indexed in Scopus and the Science Citation Index Expanded. According to the Journal Citation Reports, the journal has a 2023 impact factor of 9.3.

== See also ==
- List of chemistry journals
