= Zinc oxide nanostructure =

Zinc oxide (ZnO) nanostructures are structures with at least one dimension on the nanometre scale, composed predominantly of zinc oxide. They may be combined with other composite substances to change the chemistry, structure or function of the nanostructures in order to be used in various technologies. Many different nanostructures can be synthesised from ZnO using relatively inexpensive and simple procedures. ZnO is a semiconductor material with a wide band gap energy of 3.3eV and has the potential to be widely used on the nanoscale. ZnO nanostructures have found uses in environmental, technological and biomedical purposes including ultrafast optical functions, dye-sensitised solar cells, lithium-ion batteries, biosensors, nanolasers and supercapacitors. Research is ongoing to synthesise more productive and successful nanostructures from ZnO and other composites. ZnO nanostructures is a rapidly growing research field, with over 5000 papers published during 2014–2019.

== Synthesis ==
ZnO creates one of the most diverse range of nanostructures, and there is a great amount of research on different synthesis routes of various ZnO nanostructures. The most common methods to synthesise ZnO structures is using chemical vapor deposition (CVD), which is best used to form nanowires and comb or tree-like structures.

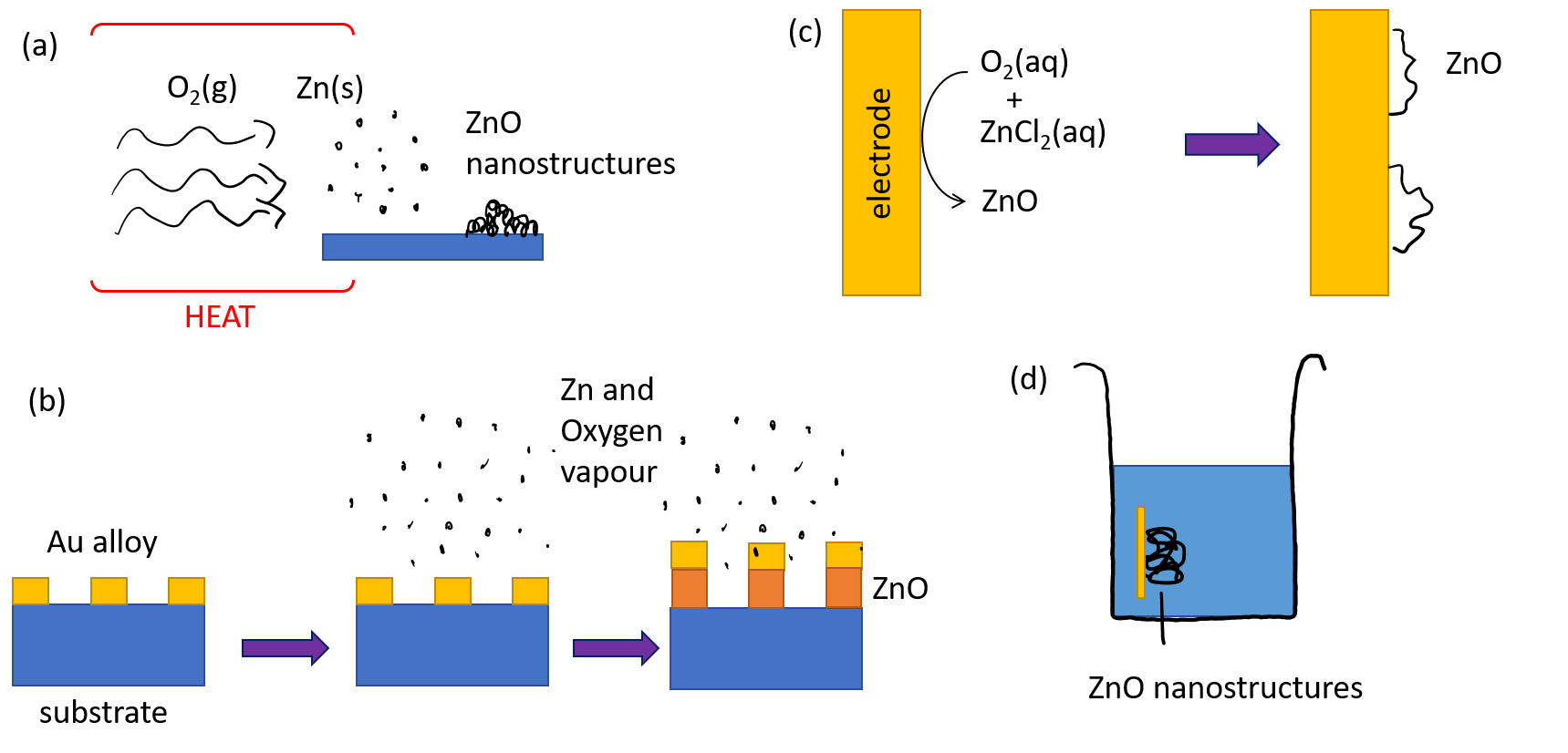
Methods to synthesis ZnO nanostructures, depicting (a) Vapour-Solid Method (b) Vapour-Liquid-Solid Method (c) Electrodeposition (d) Aqueous Solution

=== Chemical vapor deposition (CVD) ===
In vapor deposition processes, zinc and oxygen are transported in gaseous form and react with each other, creating ZnO nanostructures. Other vapor molecules or solid and liquid catalysts can also be involved in the reaction, which affect the properties of the resultant nanostructure. To directly create ZnO nanostructures, one can decompose zinc oxide at high temperatures where it splits into zinc and oxygen ions and when cooled it forms various nanostructures, including complex structures such as nanobelts and nanorings. Alternatively, zinc powder can be transported through oxygen vapor which react to form nanostructures. Other vapours such as nitrous oxide or carbon oxides can be used by themselves or in combination. These methods are known as vapor-solid (VS) processes due to their reactants states. VS processes can create a variety of ZnO nanostructures but their morphology and properties are highly dependent on the reactants and reaction conditions such as the temperature and vapor partial pressures.

Vapor deposition processes can also use catalysts to assist the growth of nanostructures. These are known as vapor-liquid-solid (VLS) processes, and use a catalytic liquid alloy phase as an extra step in nanostructure synthesis to accelerate growth. The liquid alloy, which includes zinc, is attached to nucleated seeds made usually of gold or silica. The alloy absorbs the oxygen vapor and saturates, facilitating a chemical reaction between zinc and oxygen. The nanostructure develops as the ZnO solidifies and grows outwards from the gold seed. This reaction can be highly controlled to produce more complex nanostructures by modifying the size and arrangement of gold seeds, and of the alloys and vapor constituents.

=== Aqueous solution growth ===
A large variety of ZnO nanostructures can also be synthesised by growth in an aqueous solution, which is desirable due to its simplicity and low processing temperature. A ZnO seed layer is used to begin uniform growth and to ensure nanowires are oriented. A solution of catalysts and molecules containing zinc and oxygen are reacted and nanostructures grow from the seed layer. An example of such a reaction involves hydrolysing ZnO(NO_{3})_{2} (zinc nitrate) and the decomposition of hexamethyltetramine (HMT) to form ZnO. Altering the growth solution and its concentration, temperature and structure of the seed layer can change the morphology of the synthesised nanostructures. Nanorods, aligned nanowire arrays, flower-like and disc like nanowires and nanobelt arrays, along with other nanostructures, can all be created in aqueous solutions by varying the growth solution.

=== Electrodeposition ===
Another method to synthesise ZnO nanostructures is electrodeposition, which uses electric current to facilitate chemical reactions and deposition on electrodes. Its low temperature and ability to create precise thickness structures makes it a cost-effective and environmentally friendly method. Structured nanocolumnar crystals, porous films, thin films and aligned wires have been synthesised in this way. The quality and size of these structures depends on substrates, current density, deposition time and temperature. The bandgap energy is also dependent on these parameters, since it is dependent not only on the material but also its size due to the nanoscale effect on the band structure.

== Defects and Doping ==
ZnO has a rich defect and dopant chemistry that can significantly alter properties and behaviour of the material. Doping ZnO nanostructures with other elements and molecules leads to a variety of material characteristics, because the addition or vacancy of atoms changes the energy levels in the band gap. Native defects due to oxygen and zinc vacancies or zinc interstitials create its n-type semiconductor properties, but the behaviour is not fully understood. Carriers created by doping have been found to exhibit a strong dominance over native defects. Nanostructures contain small length scales, and this results in a large surface to volume ratio. Surface defects have hence been the primary focus of research into defects of ZnO nanostructures. Deep level emissions also occur, affecting material characteristics.

ZnO can occupy multiple types of lattices, but is often found in a hexagonal wurtzite structure. In this lattice all of the octahedral sites are empty, hence there is space for intrinsic defects, Zn interstitials, and also external dopants to occupy gaps in the lattice, even when the lattice is at a nanoscale. Zn interstitials occur when extra zinc atoms are located inside the crystal ZnO lattice. They occur naturally but their concentration can be increased by using Zn vapor rich synthesis conditions. Oxygen vacancies are common defects in metal oxides where an oxygen atom is left out of the crystal structure. Both oxygen vacancies and Zn interstitials increase the number of electron charge carriers, thus becoming an n-type semiconductor. Since these defects occur naturally as a by-product of the synthesis process, it is difficult to make p-type ZnO nanostructures.

Defects and dopants are usually introduced during the synthesis of the ZnO nanostructure, either by controlling their formation or accidentally obtained during the growing process through contamination. Since it is difficult to control these processes, defects occur naturally. Dopants can diffuse into the nanostructure during synthesis. Alternatively, the nanostructures can be treated after synthesis such as through plasma injection or exposure to gases. Unwanted dopants and defects can also be manipulated so that they are removed or passivated. Crudely, the region of the nanostructure can be fully removed, such as cutting off the surface layer of a nanowire. Oxygen vacancies can be filled using plasma treatment, where an oxygen containing plasma inserts oxygen back into the lattice. At temperatures where the lattice is mobile, oxygen molecules and gaps can be moved using electric fields to change the nature of the material.

Defects and dopants are used in most ZnO nanostructure applications. Indeed, the defects in ZnO enable a variety of semiconductor properties with different band gaps. By combining ZnO with dopants, a variety of electrical and material characteristics can be achieved. For example, optical properties of ZnO can change through defects and dopants. Ferromagnetic properties can be introduced into ZnO nanostructures through doping with transition metal elements. This creates magnetic semiconductors, which is a focus of spintronics.

== Application ==
ZnO nanostructures can be used for many different applications. Here are a few examples.

=== Dye Sensitised Solar Cells ===
Dye sensitised solar cells (DSSCs) are a type of thin film solar cell that uses a liquid dye to absorb sunlight. Currently TiO_{2} (titanium dioxide) is mostly in use for DSSCs as the photoanode material. However ZnO is found to be a good candidate for photoanode material in DSSCs. This is because the nanostructure synthesis is easy to control, it has higher electron transport properties, and it is possible to use organic material as hole transporter, unlike when TiO_{2} is the photoanode material. Researchers have found that the structure of ZnO nanostructure affects the solar cell performance. There are also disadvantages for using ZnO nanostructures, like a so-called voltage leakage that needs more investigation.

=== Batteries and supercapacitors ===
Rechargeable lithium-ion batteries (LIBs) are currently the most common power source since they produce high power and have a high energy density. The use of metal oxides as anodes has largely improved the limitations of the batteries, and ZnO is particularly seen as an up-and-coming potential anode. This is due to its low toxicity and costs, and its high theoretical capacity (978 mAhg^{−1}).

ZnO experiences volume expansion during processes resulting in a loss of electrical disconnection, decreasing capacity. A solution may be to dope with different materials and to develop on the nanoscale with nanostructures, such as porous surfaces, that allow for volume changes during the chemical process. Alternatively, lithium storage components can be mixed in with the ZnO nanostructures to create a more stable capacity. Research has been successful in synthesising such composite ZnO nanostructures with carbon, graphite, and other metal oxides.

Another commonly used energy storage appliance are supercapacitors (SCs). The SCs are mostly used in electric vehicles and as backup power systems. They are known for being environmentally friendly and may replace the currently used energy storage devices. This is due to its more advanced stability, power density and overall greater performance. Because of its remarkable energy density of 650Aħg^{−1} and electrical conductivity of 230Scm^{−1} ZnO is recognized as a great potential electrode material. Nonetheless, it has poor electrical conductivity as its small surface area makes for a restricted capacity. Just as for the batteries, multiple combinations of carbon structures, graphene, metal oxides with ZnO nanostructures have improved capacitance of these materials. A composite with ZnO base has not only a better power density and energy density, but is also more cost-effective and eco-friendly.

=== Biosensors and biomedical ===
It has already been discovered that ZnO nanostructures are able to bind biological substances. Recent research shows that because of this trait and because of its surface selectivity, ZnO is a good candidate for a biosensor. It can naturally form anisotropic nanostructures that are used to deliver drugs. ZnO based biosensors can also help in diagnosing the early stages of cancer. There is ongoing research to see if ZnO nanostructures can be used for bioimaging. It has so far only been tested on mice and shows positive results. In addition, ZnO nanomaterials are already used in cosmetic products, like face creams and sun cream

It is, however, not yet clear what the effect of ZnO nanostructures is on human cells and the environment. Since used ZnO biosensors will eventually dissolve and release Zn ions, they may be absorbed by the cells and the local effect of this is not yet known. Nanomaterials in cosmetics will eventually be washed off and released in the environment. Due to these unknown risks, there needs to be a lot more research before ZnO can be safely applied in the biomedical field.
