= Side reaction =

A side reaction is a chemical reaction that occurs at the same time as the actual main reaction, but to a lesser extent. It leads to the formation of by-product, so that the yield of main product is reduced:

$$\ce{{A} + B ->[{k_1}] P1}$$

$$\ce{{A} + C ->[{k_2}] P2}$$

P_{1} is the main product if k_{1}> k_{2}. The by-product P_{2} is generally undesirable and must be separated from the actual main product (usually in a costly process).

== In organic synthesis ==
B and C from the above equations usually represent different compounds. However, they could also just be different positions in the same molecule.

A side reaction is also referred to as a competing reaction when different compounds (B, C) compete for another reactant (A). If the side reaction occurs about as often as the main reaction, it is called a parallel reaction, especially in kinetics.

There may also be more complicated relationships; for example, Compound A could reversibly but quickly react to substance B (with speed k_{1}), or irreversibly but slowly (k_{1}> k_{−1} >> k_{2}) to substance C:

$$\ce{B <=> A ->[{k_2}] C}$$

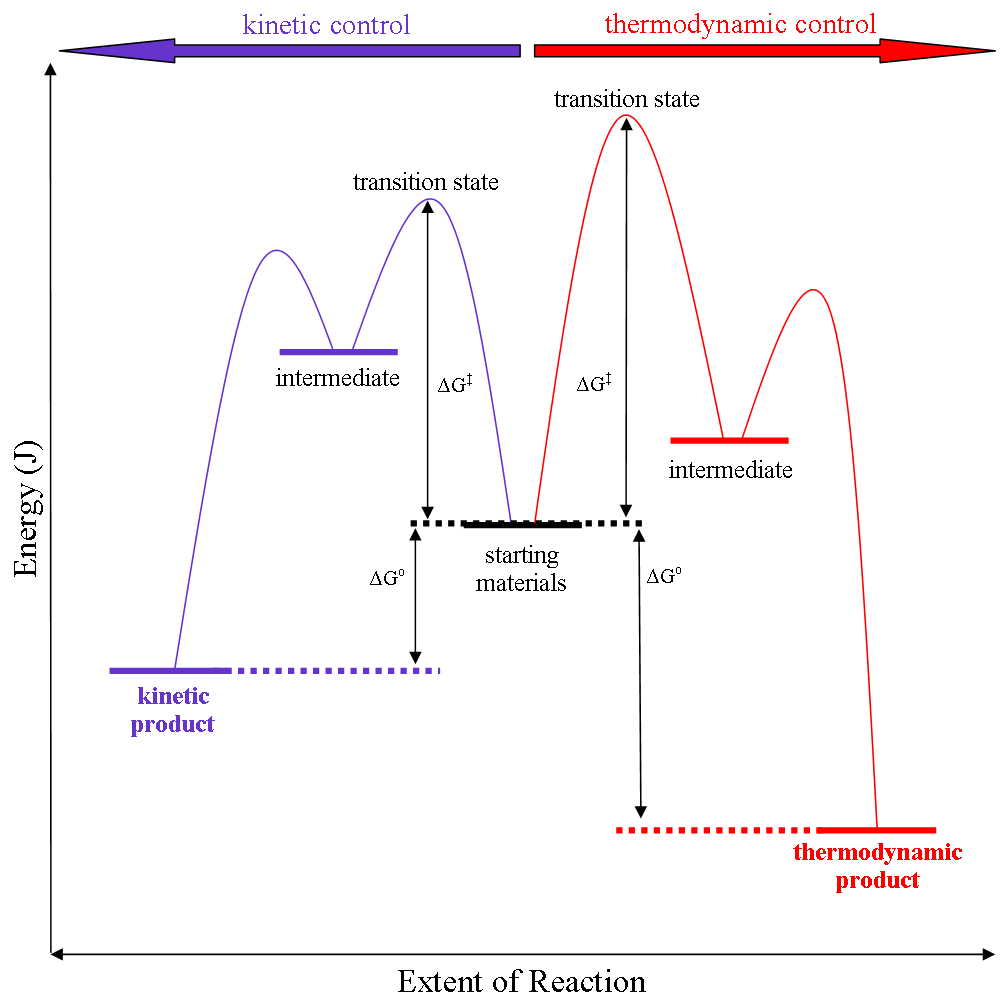
General energy profile diagram for thermodynamic versus kinetic control

Assuming that the reaction to substance C is irreversible, as it is thermodynamically very stable, B is the kinetic and C is the thermodynamic product of the reaction. If the reaction is carried out at low temperatures and stopped after a short time, it is called kinetic control; the kinetic product, B, is the primary substance formed. When the reaction is carried out at high temperatures and for long time (in which case the necessary activation energy for the reaction to C is available, which is progressively formed over time), it is called thermodynamic control; the thermodynamic product, C, is the primary substance formed.

=== Conditions for side reactions ===
In organic synthesis, elevated temperatures usually lead to more side products. Side products are usually undesirable, therefore low temperatures are preferred ("mild conditions"). The ratio between competing reactions may be influenced by a change in temperature because their activation energies are different in most cases. Reactions with high activation energy can be more strongly accelerated by an increase in temperature than those with low activation energy. Also, the state of equilibrium depends on temperature.

Detection reactions can be distorted by side reactions.

== Kinetics ==
Side reactions are also described in the reaction kinetics, a branch of physical chemistry. Side reactions are understood as complex reactions, since the overall reaction (main reaction + side reaction) is composed of several (at least two) elementary reactions. Other complex reactions are competing reactions, parallel reactions, consecutive reactions, chain reactions, reversible reactions, etc.

If one reaction occurs much faster than the other one (k_{1} > k_{2}), it (k_{1}) is called the main reaction, and the other (k_{2}) is the side reaction. If both reactions occur at roughly the same speed (k_{1} ≅ k_{2}), the reactions are referred to as parallel reactions.

If the reactions $\ce{{A} + B ->[{k_1}] P1}$ and $\ce{{A} + C ->[{k_2}] P2}$ are irreversible (without reverse reactions), then the ratio of P_{1} and P_{2} corresponds to the relative reactivity of B and C compared with A:

$$\frac\ce{[P1]}\ce{[P2]} =  \frac{k_1 [\ce B]}{k_2 [\ce C]}$$

== See also ==
- Rate equation § Parallel or competitive reactions
