= Volume combustion synthesis =

Volume combustion synthesis (VCS) is method of chemical synthesis in which the reactants are heated uniformly in a controlled manner until a reaction ignites throughout the volume of the reaction chamber. The VCS mode is typically used for weakly exothermic reactions that require preheating prior to ignition.
