= Neil McKeown =

British materials scientist

- Education: University of East Anglia
- Awards: Beilby Medal and Prize (2008); Tilden Prize (2017)
- Scientific career
- Fields: Chemistry
- Workplaces: University of Edinburgh; Cardiff University; University of Manchester
- Thesis: The design, synthesis and assessment of novel phthalocyanines for application in molecular electronics (1987)
- Doctoral advisor: Mike Cook

Neil Bruce McKeown FRSE is a chemist who is currently Crawford Professor of Chemistry at the University of Edinburgh.

== Education ==
He was educated at the University of East Anglia (BSc, 1984; PhD, 1987).

== Career ==
After obtaining his PhD from the University of East Anglia, McKeown served as a postdoctoral fellow at York University, Ontario, from 1987 to 1989. He was then a research associate at Toronto General Hospital, affiliated with the University of Toronto, from 1989 to 1991. This was followed by lecturing positions at Manchester (1991-2003), Cardiff (2004-2013) and finally Edinburgh (2014-present).

== Honours ==
McKeown was awarded the Beilby Medal and Prize in 2008, and was elected a Fellow of the Royal Society of Edinburgh in 2017. He was awarded the Tilden Prize in 2017.
