= Industrial separation processes =

Industrial separation processes are technical procedures which are used in industry to separate a product from impurities or other products. The original mixture may either be a natural resource (like ore, oil or sugar cane) or the product of a chemical reaction (like a drug or an organic solvent).

== Significance ==
Separation processes are of great economic importance as they are accounting for 40 – 90% of capital and operating costs in industry. The separation processes of mixtures are including besides others washing, extraction, pressing, drying, clarification, evaporation, crystallization and filtration. Often several separation processes are performed successively. Separation operations are having several different functions:

- Purification of raw materials and products and recovery of by-products
- Recycling of solvents and unconverted reactants
- Removal of contaminants from effluents

== Classification ==
A heterogeneous mixture (e. g. liquid and solid) can be separated by mechanical separation processes like filtration or centrifugation. Homogeneous mixtures can be separated by molecular separation processes; these are either equilibrium-based or rate-controlled. Equilibrium-based processes are operating by the formation of two immiscible phases with different compositions at equilibrium, an example is distillation (in distillation the vapor has another composition than the liquid). Rate-controlled processes are based on different transport rates of compounds through a medium, examples are adsorption, ion exchange or crystallization.

Separation of a mixture into two phases can be done by an energy separating agent, a mass separating agent, a barrier or external fields. Energy-separating agents are used for creating a second phase (immiscible of different composition than the first phase), they are the most common techniques used in industry. For example, leads the addition of heat (the separating agent) to a liquid (first phase) to the formation of vapor (second phase). Mass-separating agents are other chemicals. They selectively dissolve or absorb one of the products; they are either a liquid (for sorption, extractive distillation or extraction) or a solid (for adsorption or ion exchange). The use of a barrier which restricts the movement of one compound but not of the other one (semipermeable membranes) is less common; external fields are used just in special applications.
