= NASA =

American space and aeronautics agency

- NASA seal

- NASA insignia

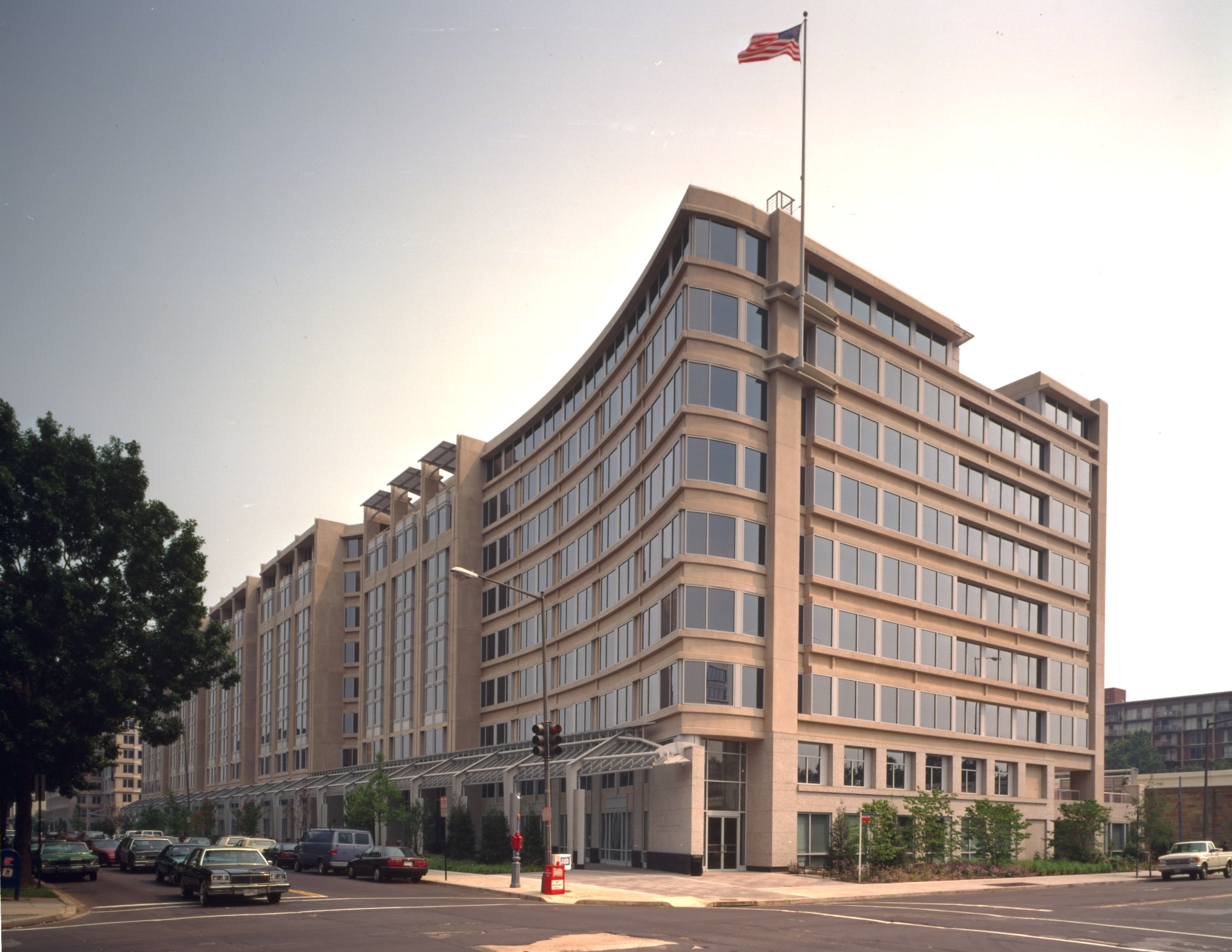
- Mary W. Jackson NASA Headquarters building in Washington, D.C.

Agency overview
- Abbreviation: NASA
- Formed: July 29, 1958; 68 years ago
- Preceding agency: National Advisory Committee for Aeronautics (1915–1958)
- Type: Space agency Aeronautics research agency
- Jurisdiction: United States federal government
- Headquarters: Mary W. Jackson NASA Headquarters Washington, D.C., U.S.; 38°52′59″N 77°0′59″W
- Administrator: Jared Isaacman
- Deputy Administrator: Matt Anderson
- Associate Administrator: Amit Kshatriya
- Primary spaceports: Kennedy Space Center; Cape Canaveral Space Force Station; Vandenberg Space Force Base; Wallops Flight Facility; Marshall Space Flight Center
- Employees: 21,000 civil servants (2026)
- Annual budget: ▼US$24.4 billion (2026)
- Website: nasa.gov

The National Aeronautics and Space Administration (NASA; /ˈnæsə/) is an independent agency of the U.S. federal government responsible for the United States' civil space program, as well as research in aeronautics and space. Headquartered in Washington, D.C., NASA operates ten field centers across the US and is organized into three mission directorates: Human Spaceflight, Research and Technology, and Science. Established in 1958 amid the Space Race, NASA succeeded the National Advisory Committee for Aeronautics (NACA) to give the US space program a distinct civilian orientation focused on peaceful applications. Since then, it has led most American spaceflight programs, including Project Mercury, Project Gemini, the Apollo program, Skylab, the Space Shuttle, the International Space Station (ISS), and the ongoing multinational Artemis program.

NASA maintains extensive ground and communications infrastructure, including the Deep Space Network and the Near Earth Network. Its science programs focus on Earth observation through the Earth Observing System, heliophysics research, Solar System exploration with robotic missions such as New Horizons and the Perseverance rover, and astrophysics investigations using space-based observatories including the James Webb Space Telescope and the Hubble Space Telescope. The Launch Services Program oversees operations for uncrewed launches.

The agency supports the ISS through international partnerships and highly successful commercial initiatives, such as the Commercial Crew Program and Commercial Resupply Services. NASA also leads the development of the Orion spacecraft and the Space Launch System rocket for the Artemis program. NASA collaborates globally with organizations including the European Space Agency (ESA), the Japan Aerospace Exploration Agency (JAXA), the Canadian Space Agency (CSA), and Russia's Roscosmos (for ISS operations), as well as domestically with US agencies such as the National Oceanic and Atmospheric Administration, the United States Geological Survey, and the United States Space Force. NASA's missions and media initiatives, including the NASA+ streaming service, contribute significantly to its public visibility and outreach. The agency has also influenced popular culture since the historic Apollo 11 Moon landing in 1969. For fiscal year 2026, NASA was authorized a budget of $24.4 billion and employs approximately 18,400 civil servants; since December 2025, its administrator has been Jared Isaacman.

== History ==
=== Creation ===
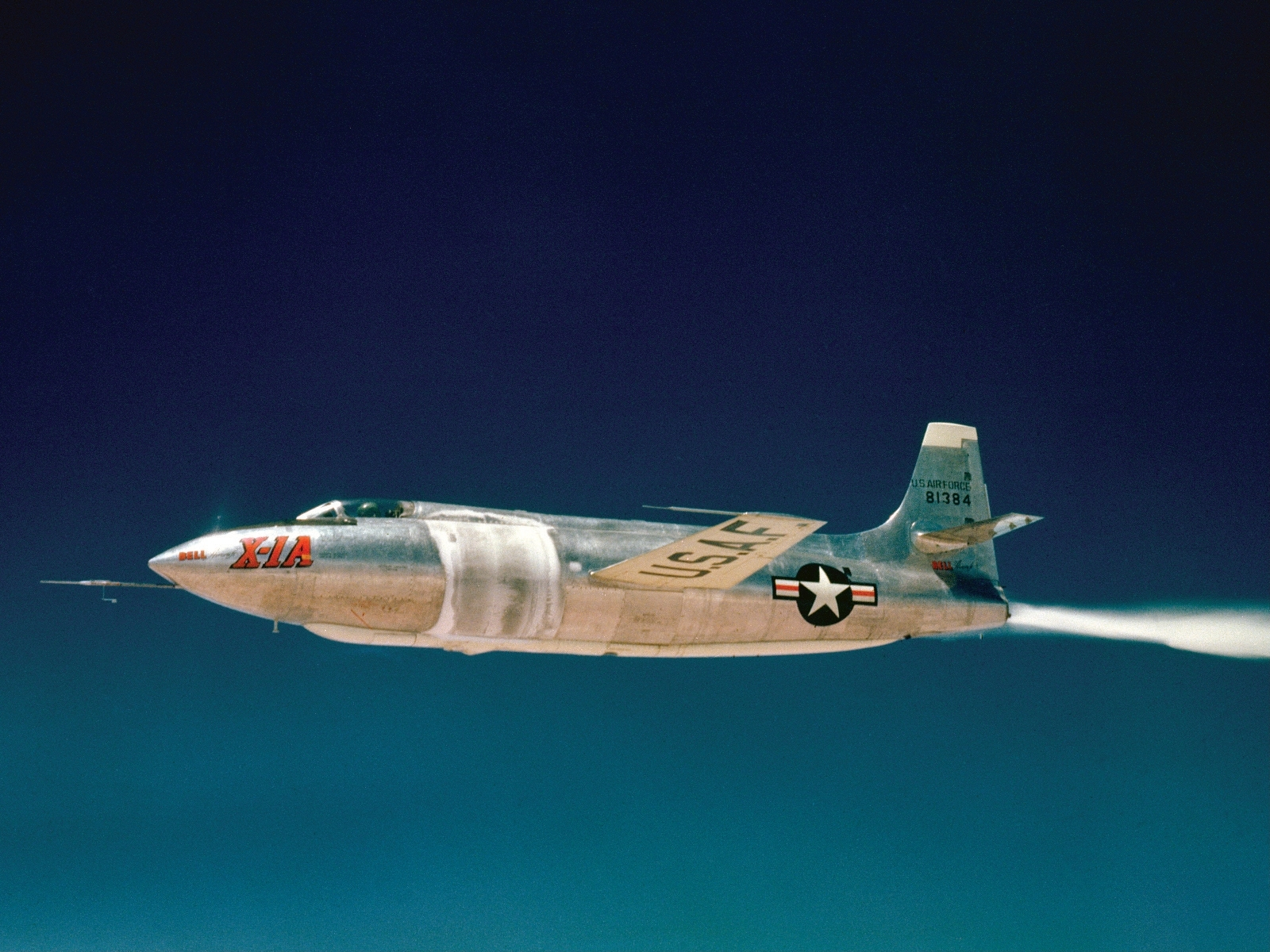
A US Air Force Bell X-1 test flight

NASA traces its roots to the National Advisory Committee for Aeronautics (NACA). Although Dayton, Ohio, is considered the birthplace of aviation, by 1914 the United States recognized that it lagged significantly behind Europe in aviation capability. Determined to regain American leadership in aviation, the US Congress created the Aviation Section of the US Army Signal Corps in 1914 and established NACA in 1915 to foster aeronautical research and development. Over the next forty years, NACA conducted aeronautical research in support of the US Air Force, US Army, US Navy, and the civil aviation sector. Following the end of World War II, NACA became interested in the possibilities of guided missiles and supersonic aircraft, developing and testing the Bell X-1 in a joint program with the US Air Force. NACA's interest in space grew out of its rocketry program at the Pilotless Aircraft Research Division.

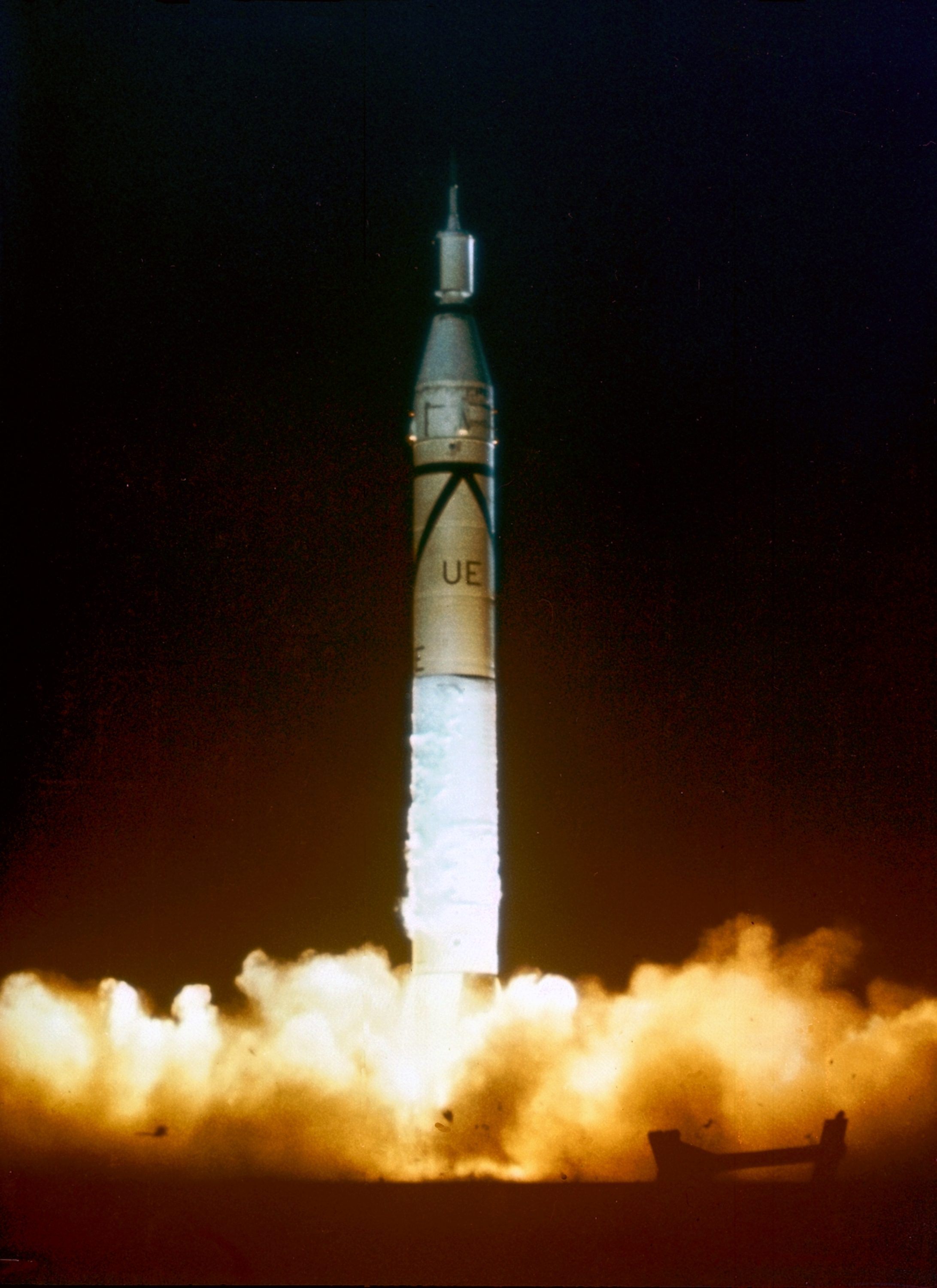
Launch of the Army Ballistic Missile Agency's Explorer 1, America's first satellite

The Soviet Union's launch of Sputnik 1 ushered in the Space Age and kicked off the Space Race. Despite NACA's early rocketry program, the responsibility for launching the first American satellite initially fell to the Naval Research Laboratory's Project Vanguard. Vanguard's operational issues led the Army Ballistic Missile Agency to successfully launch Explorer 1, America's first satellite, on February 1, 1958.

The Eisenhower Administration decided to separate the nation's military and civil spaceflight programs, which had been previously organized together under the Department of Defense's Advanced Research Projects Agency. NASA was established on July 29, 1958, with the signing of the National Aeronautics and Space Act, and began operations on October 1, 1958.

As America's premier aeronautics agency, NACA formed the core of NASA's new structure, reassigning 8,000 employees and three major research laboratories to the new entity. NASA also absorbed the Naval Research Laboratory's Project Vanguard, the Army's Jet Propulsion Laboratory (JPL), and the Army Ballistic Missile Agency under the leadership of Wernher von Braun. This established NASA firmly as the US's civil space leader, while the Air Force retained military space leadership.

=== First orbital and hypersonic flights ===
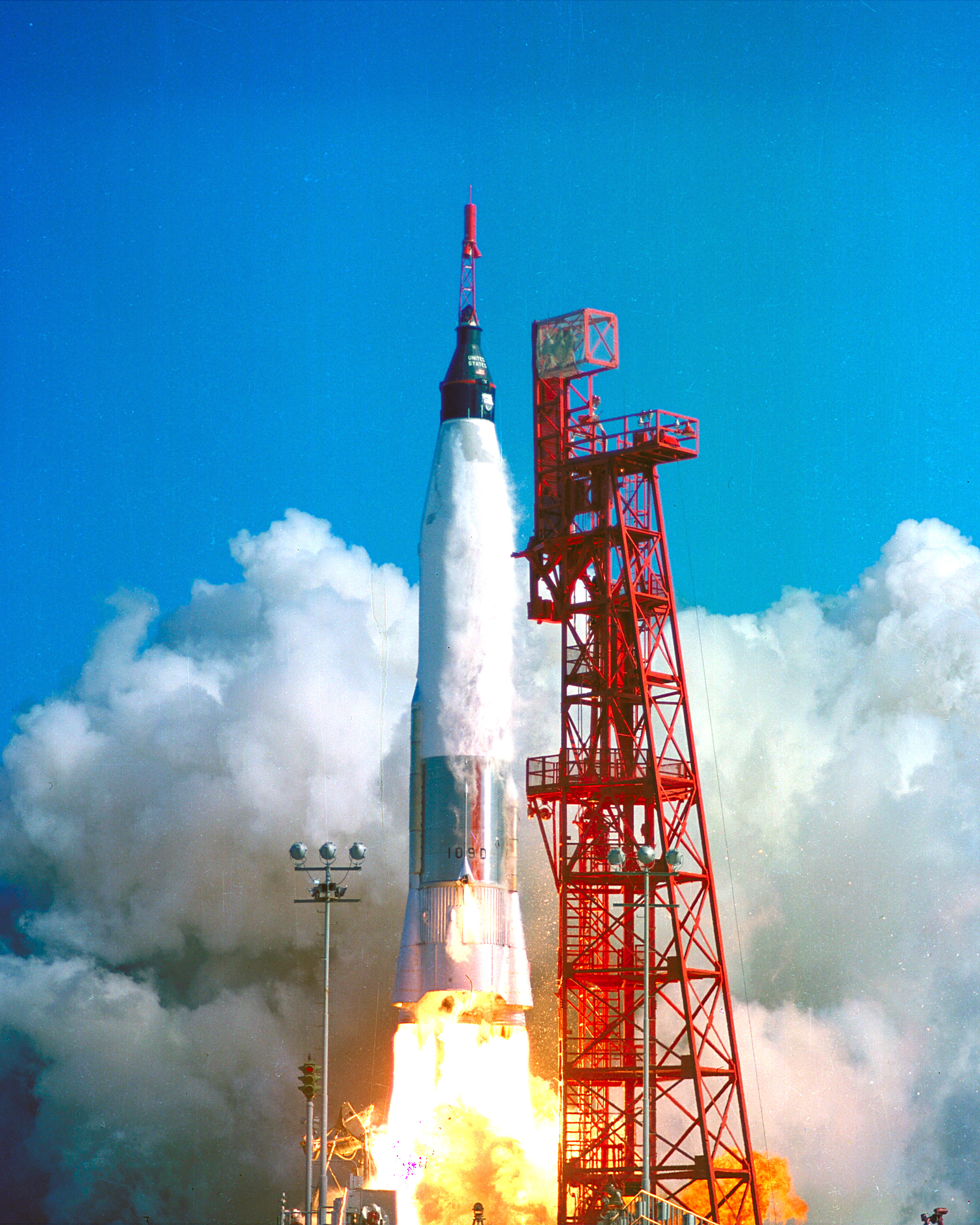
Launch of Friendship 7, NASA's first crewed orbital flight, February 20, 1962

Plans for human spaceflight began within the US Armed Forces prior to NASA's creation. The Air Force's Man in Space Soonest project formed in 1956, coupled with the Army's Project Adam, serving as the foundation for Project Mercury. NASA established the Space Task Group to manage the program, which conducted crewed suborbital flights with the Army's Redstone rockets and orbital flights with the Air Force's Atlas launch vehicles. While NASA originally intended for its first astronauts to be civilians, President Eisenhower directed that they be selected from the military. The Mercury 7 astronauts included three Air Force pilots, three Navy aviators, and one Marine Corps pilot.

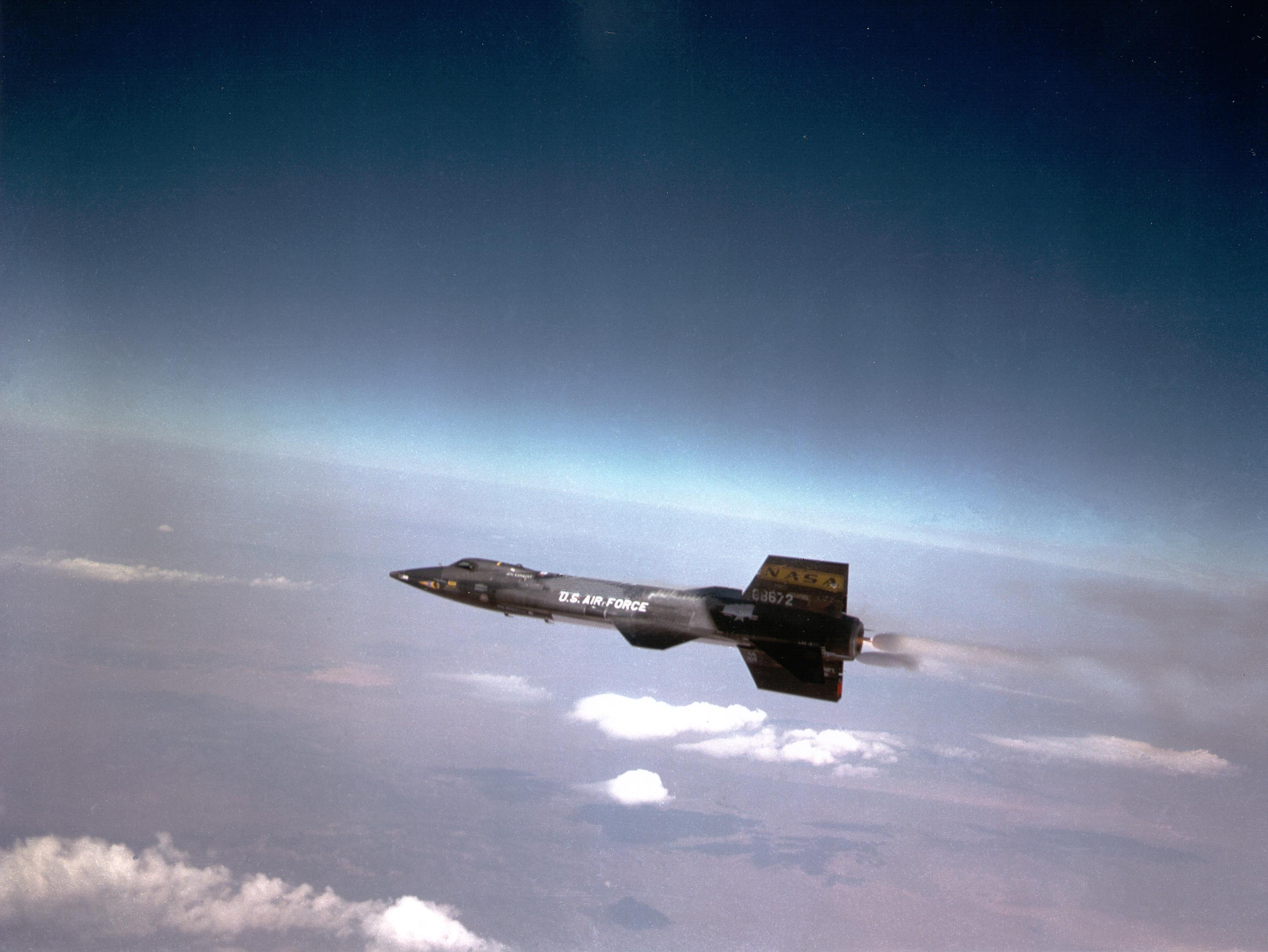
The NASA–Air Force X-15 hypersonic aircraft

On May 5, 1961, Alan Shepard became the first American to enter space, performing a suborbital spaceflight aboard Freedom 7. This flight occurred 23 days after the Soviet cosmonaut Yuri Gagarin became the first human in space, executing a full orbital flight. NASA's first orbital spaceflight was conducted by John Glenn on February 20, 1962, in the Friendship 7, completing three full orbits before reentering. Glenn had to fly parts of his final two orbits manually due to an autopilot malfunction. The sixth and final Mercury mission was flown by Gordon Cooper in May 1963, completing 22 orbits over 34 hours aboard Faith 7. The Mercury program was widely recognized as a resounding success, achieving its objectives to orbit a human in space, develop tracking and control systems, and identify other technical and physiological issues associated with human spaceflight.

While much of NASA's attention turned to space, it continued its aeronautics mission. Early aeronautics research attempted to build upon the X-1's supersonic flight to develop an aircraft capable of hypersonic flight. The North American X-15 was a joint NASA–US Air Force program, with the hypersonic test aircraft becoming the first non-dedicated spacecraft to cross from the atmosphere into outer space. The X-15 also served as a critical testbed for Apollo program technologies, as well as ramjet and scramjet propulsion.

=== Moon landing ===
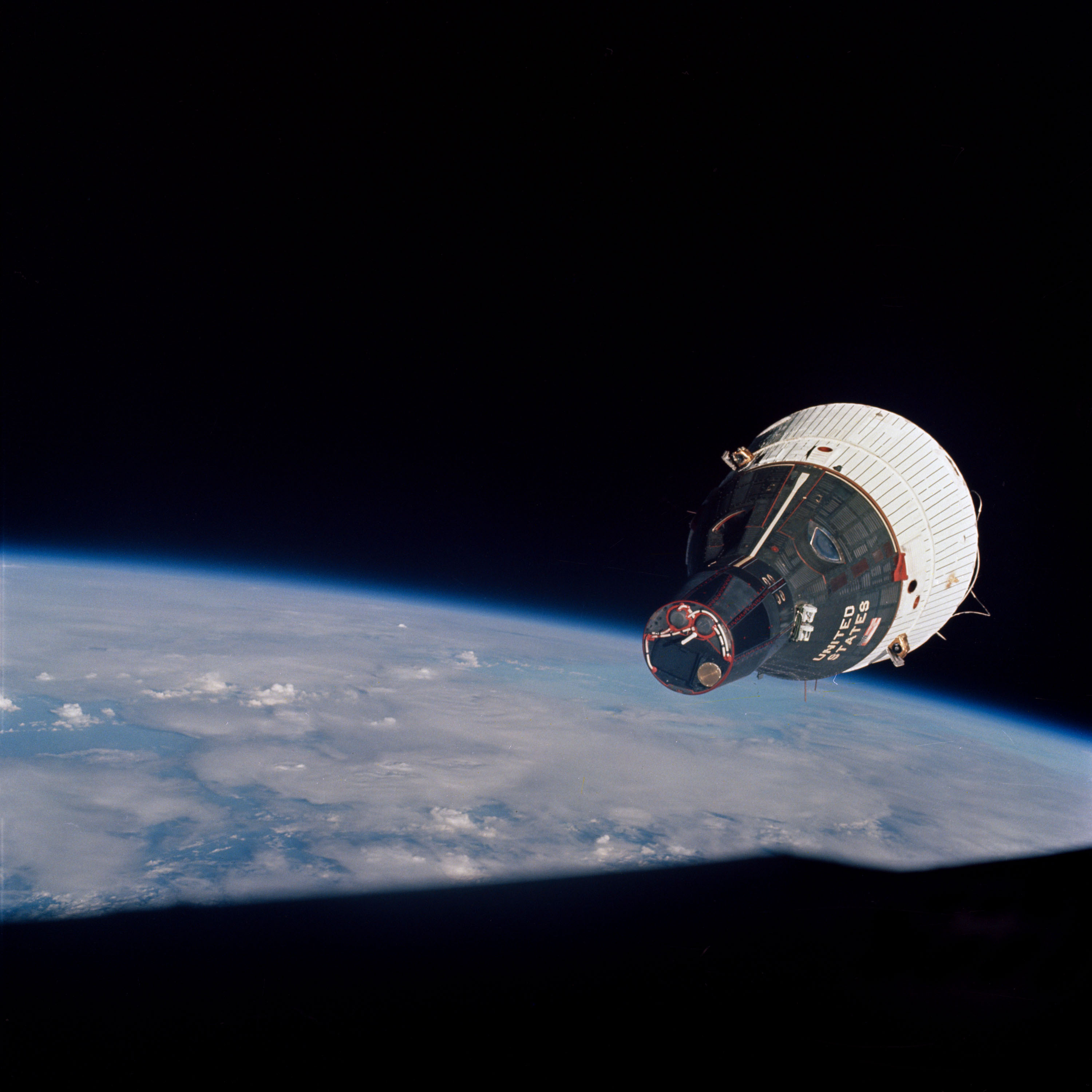
Gemini 6 and Gemini 7 conduct an orbital rendezvous

Escalations in the Cold War between the US and the Soviet Union prompted President John F. Kennedy to charge NASA with landing a man on the Moon and returning him safely to Earth by the end of the 1960s. Kennedy installed James E. Webb as NASA administrator to execute this ambitious objective. On May 25, 1961, Kennedy openly declared this goal in his "Urgent National Needs" speech to Congress, stating:

I believe this Nation should commit itself to achieving the goal, before this decade is out, of landing a man on the Moon and returning him safely to Earth. No single space project in this period will be more impressive to mankind, or more important for the long-range exploration of space; and none will be so difficult or expensive to accomplish.

Kennedy further galvanized the nation during his "We choose to go to the Moon" speech on September 12, 1962, at Rice University, hoping to reinforce public support for the Apollo program.

Despite criticism of the Moon landing goal from former president Dwight D. Eisenhower and 1964 presidential candidate Barry Goldwater, President Kennedy was able to protect NASA's growing budget, half of which was dedicated directly to human spaceflight. It was later estimated that, at its peak, 5% of the American workforce contributed in some capacity to the Apollo program.

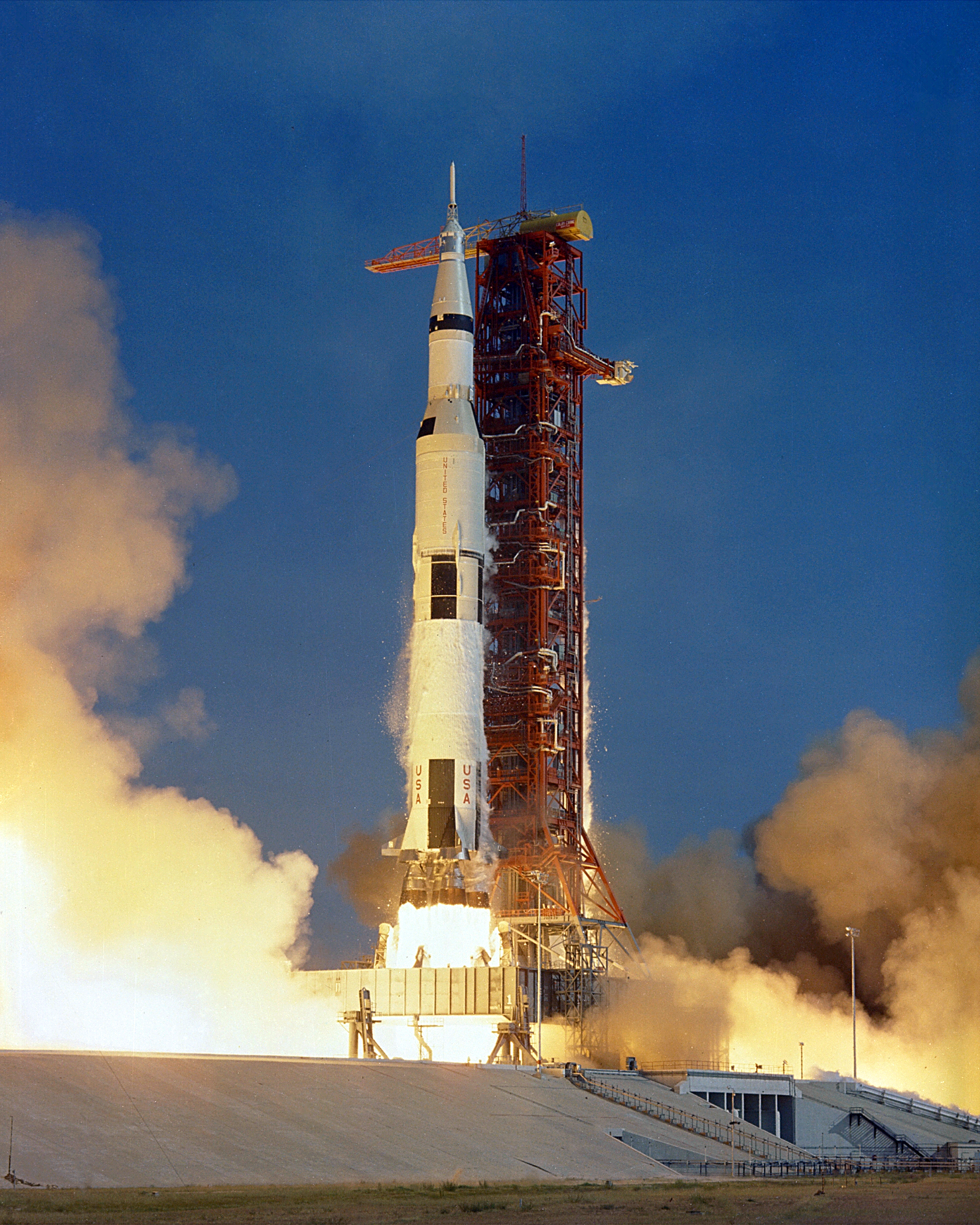
Launch of the 1969 Apollo 11 mission

Mirroring the Department of Defense's management concept of using redundant systems to build the first intercontinental ballistic missiles, NASA requested that the Air Force assign Major General Samuel C. Phillips to the space agency, where he served as the director of the Apollo program. Development of the Saturn V rocket was led by Wernher von Braun and his team at the Marshall Space Flight Center, deriving it from the Army Ballistic Missile Agency's original Saturn I. The Apollo spacecraft was designed and built by North American Aviation, while the Apollo Lunar Module was designed and built by Grumman.

To develop the spaceflight skills and equipment required for a lunar mission, NASA initiated Project Gemini. Using a modified Air Force Titan II launch vehicle, the Gemini capsule could hold two astronauts for flights lasting over two weeks. Gemini pioneered the use of fuel cells instead of batteries, and conducted the first American spacewalks and orbital rendezvous operations.

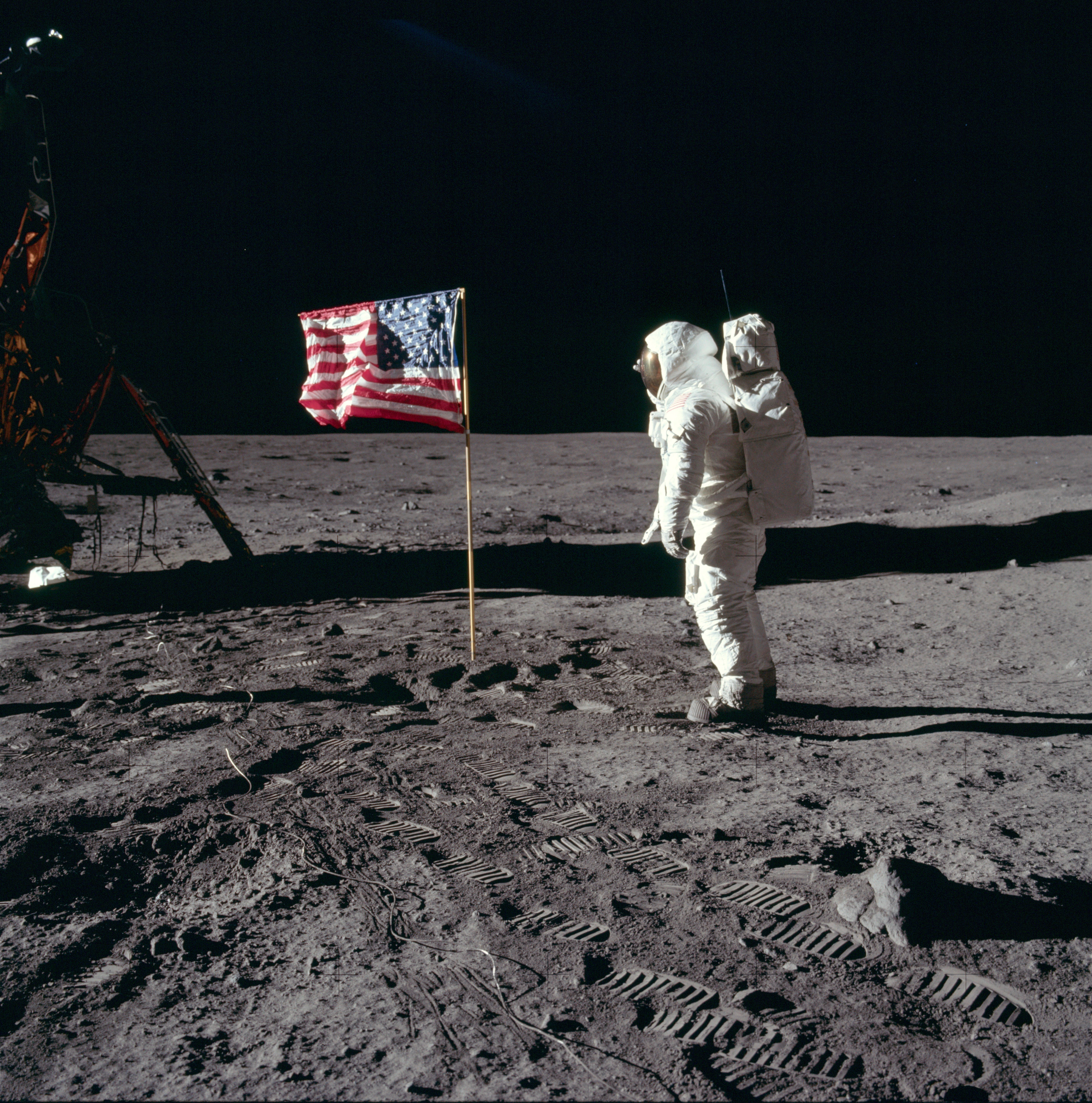
Buzz Aldrin salutes the US flag on the lunar surface

The Ranger Program started in the 1950s as a response to Soviet lunar exploration; however, most early missions ended in failure. The Lunar Orbiter program achieved greater success, mapping the surface in preparation for Apollo landings, conducting meteoroid detection, and measuring radiation levels. The Surveyor program conducted uncrewed lunar landings and takeoffs, capturing surface and regolith observations. Despite the tragic setback caused by the Apollo 1 fire, which killed three astronauts, the lunar program proceeded.

Apollo 8 was the first crewed spacecraft to leave low Earth orbit and the first human spaceflight to reach the Moon. The crew orbited the Moon ten times on December 24 and 25, 1968, before returning safely to Earth. The three Apollo 8 astronauts—Frank Borman, James Lovell, and William Anders—were the first humans to see the Earth as a globe in space, the first to witness an Earthrise, and the first to manually photograph the far side of the Moon.

The first lunar landing was achieved by Apollo 11. Commanded by Neil Armstrong alongside astronauts Buzz Aldrin and Michael Collins, Apollo 11 was one of the most historically significant missions in NASA's history, effectively ending the Space Race as the Soviet Union subsequently scaled back its lunar ambitions. Becoming the first human to step on the surface of the Moon, Neil Armstrong uttered his now famous words:

That's one small step for [a] man, one giant leap for mankind.

NASA conducted a total of six lunar landings as part of the Apollo program, with Apollo 17 concluding the program in 1972.

==== End of Apollo ====
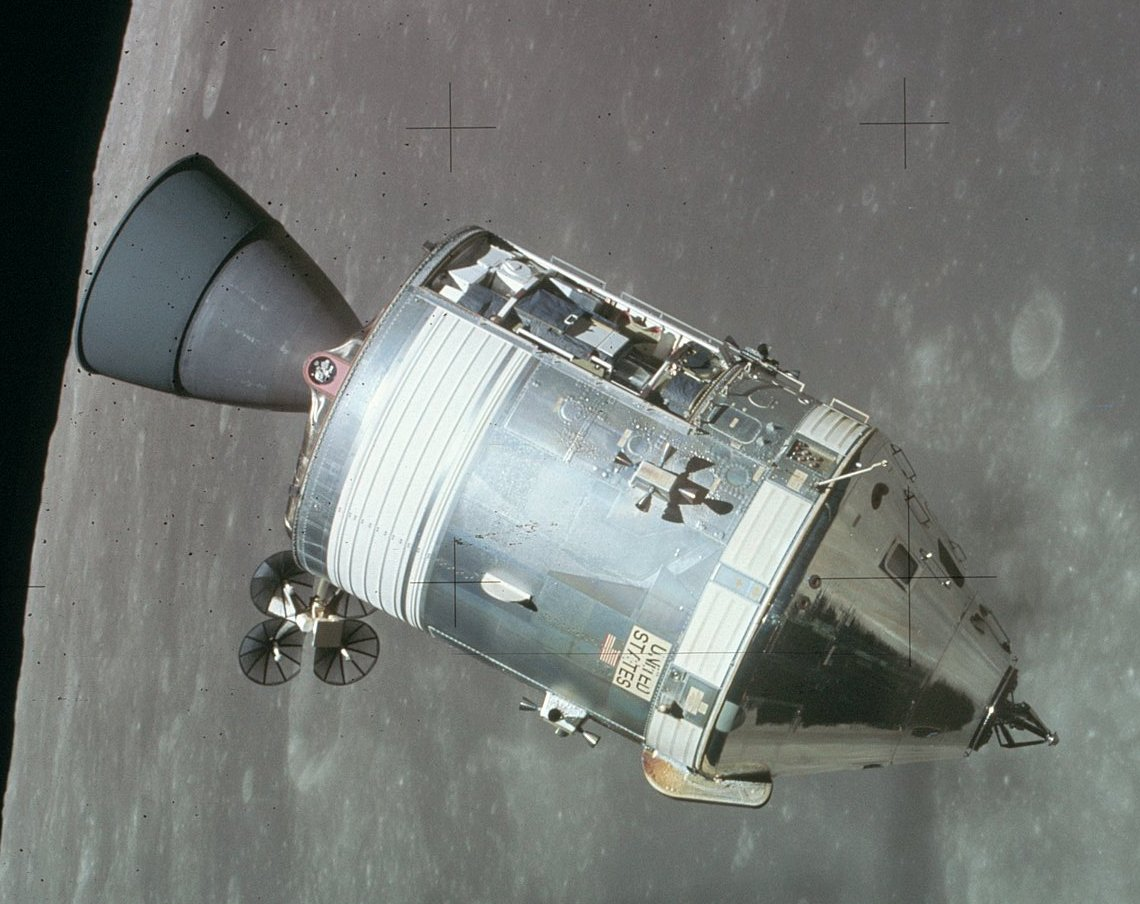
Apollo 15 CSM Endeavour in lunar orbit

Wernher von Braun had advocated for NASA to develop a space station since the agency's creation. In 1973, following the end of the Apollo lunar missions, NASA launched its first space station, Skylab, aboard the final flight of the Saturn V rocket. Skylab heavily reused Apollo and Saturn hardware, with a repurposed Saturn V third stage serving as the primary orbital module. Damage sustained during its launch required the first crew to perform critical spacewalks to render the station habitable and operational. Skylab hosted nine missions and was decommissioned in 1974. It ultimately deorbited in 1979, two years prior to the inaugural flight of the Space Shuttle, making any attempt to boost its orbit impossible.

In 1975, the Apollo–Soyuz test project represented the first international spaceflight and a major diplomatic accomplishment between the Cold War rivals, simultaneously marking the last flight of the Apollo capsule. During this mission, an American Apollo spacecraft docked in orbit with a Soviet Soyuz capsule.

=== Interplanetary exploration and space science ===
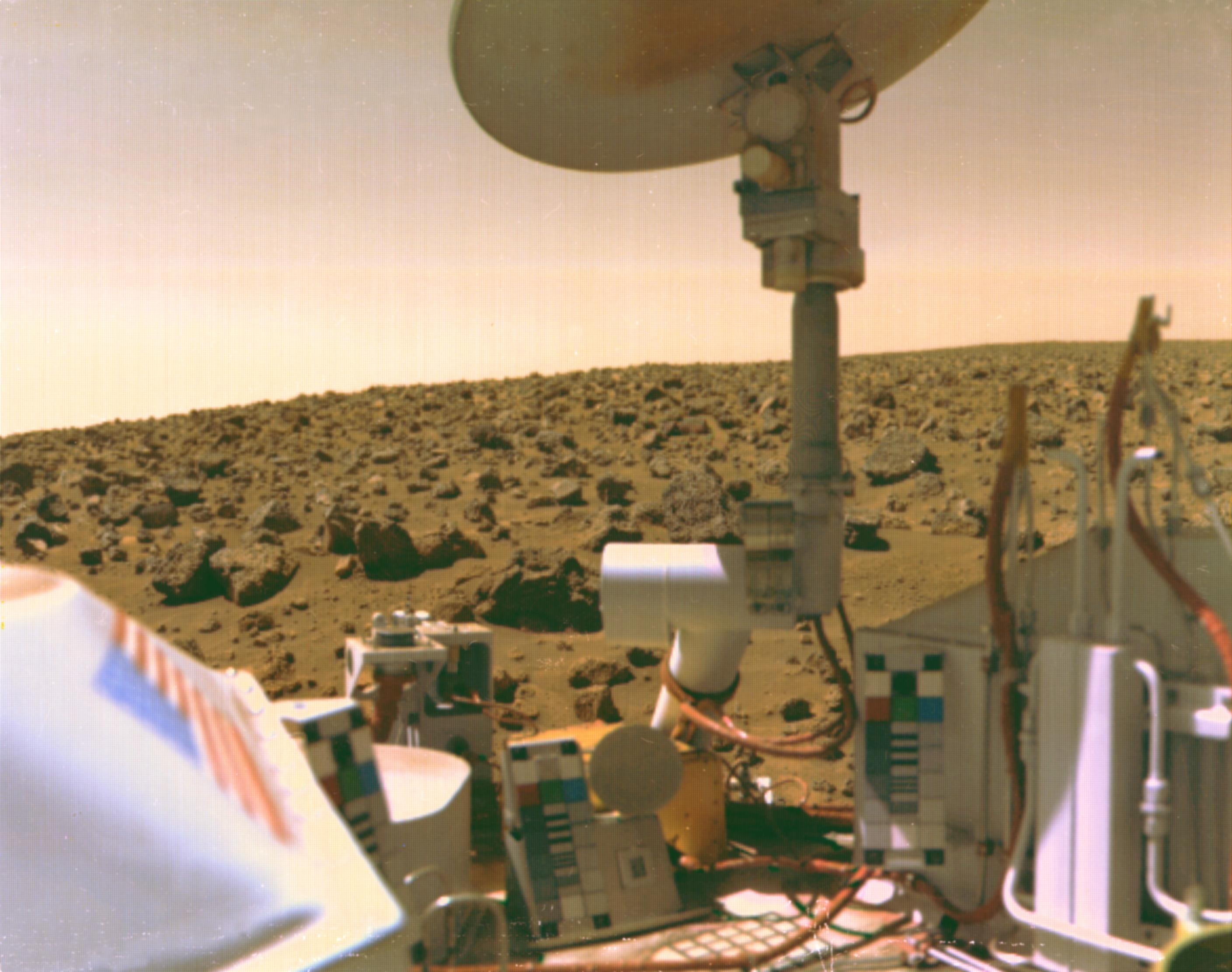
Image from Mars taken by the Viking 2 lander

During the 1960s, NASA expanded its space science and interplanetary probe program. The Mariner program served as its flagship, launching probes to Venus, Mars, and Mercury throughout the decade. The Jet Propulsion Laboratory became the lead NASA center for robotic interplanetary exploration, facilitating significant discoveries about the inner planets. Despite these early successes, Congress became hesitant to fund further interplanetary missions, and NASA Administrator James Webb suspended all future interplanetary probes to focus the agency's resources on the Apollo program.

Following the conclusion of Apollo, NASA resumed launching interplanetary probes and expanded its space science programs. The first planet targeted for intensive exploration was Venus, which shares several similarities to Earth. First visited by the American Mariner 2 spacecraft, Venus was revealed to be a hot and inhospitable planet. Follow-on missions included the Pioneer Venus project in the 1970s and Magellan, which performed extensive radar mapping of Venus's surface in the 1980s and 1990s. Later missions primarily utilized Venus flybys for gravity assists on their way to other destinations in the Solar System.

Mars has long been a planet of intense fascination for NASA, being suspected of having potentially harbored life in its past. Mariner 5 was the first NASA spacecraft to fly by Mars, followed by Mariner 6 and Mariner 7. Mariner 9 was the first orbital mission to Mars. Launched in 1975, the Viking program culminated in two successful surface landings on Mars in 1976. Surface exploration would not resume until 1996, with the Mars Global Surveyor orbiter and Mars Pathfinder, the latter deploying the first Mars rover, Sojourner. During the early 2000s, the 2001 Mars Odyssey orbiter reached the planet, and in 2004 the twin Spirit and Opportunity rovers landed on the Red Planet. They were followed in 2005 by the Mars Reconnaissance Orbiter and the 2007 Phoenix Mars lander. The 2012 landing of Curiosity revealed that the radiation levels on Mars were comparable to those on the International Space Station (ISS)—increasing the plausibility of future human exploration—and detected key chemical ingredients necessary for life. In 2013, the Mars Atmosphere and Volatile Evolution (MAVEN) mission observed the Martian upper atmosphere and space environment, while the 2018 Interior Exploration using Seismic Investigations, Geodesy and Heat Transport (InSight) lander studied the Martian interior. The 2021 landing of the Perseverance rover included the deployment of the first extraplanetary aircraft, a robotic helicopter named Ingenuity.

NASA also returned to Mercury in 2004, with the MESSENGER probe demonstrating the first use of solar sailing techniques for trajectory control. NASA had been launching probes to the outer Solar System since the 1970s. Pioneer 10 became the first probe to visit the outer planets, flying by Jupiter, while Pioneer 11 provided the first close-up view of the system. Both probes eventually became the first artificial objects to leave the Solar System. The Voyager program launched in 1977, executing historic flybys of Jupiter, Saturn, Neptune, and Uranus on a trajectory extending into interstellar space. The Galileo spacecraft, deployed from Space Shuttle flight STS-34, became the first spacecraft to orbit Jupiter, discovering strong evidence of a subsurface ocean on the moon Europa. A joint NASA–ESA–ASI mission, Cassini–Huygens, explored Saturn's moon Titan—which, along with Mars and Europa, is considered one of the few celestial bodies in the Solar System capable of harboring life. Cassini discovered three new moons around Saturn, and the Huygens probe successfully entered Titan's atmosphere. The mission found evidence of liquid hydrocarbon lakes on Titan and a subsurface water ocean on the moon Enceladus, offering further astrobiological potential. Finally, the New Horizons mission, launched in 2006, became the first spacecraft to visit Pluto and the deeper Kuiper belt.

Beyond interplanetary probes, NASA has deployed an array of sophisticated space telescopes. Initiated in the 1960s, the Orbiting Astronomical Observatory program comprised NASA's first orbital telescopes, delivering groundbreaking ultraviolet, gamma-ray, X-ray, and infrared observations. In the 1960s and 1970s, NASA launched the Orbiting Geophysical Observatory satellites to observe Earth and its interactions with the Sun. The Uhuru satellite became the first dedicated X-ray telescope, mapping 85% of the sky and discovering a large number of black holes.

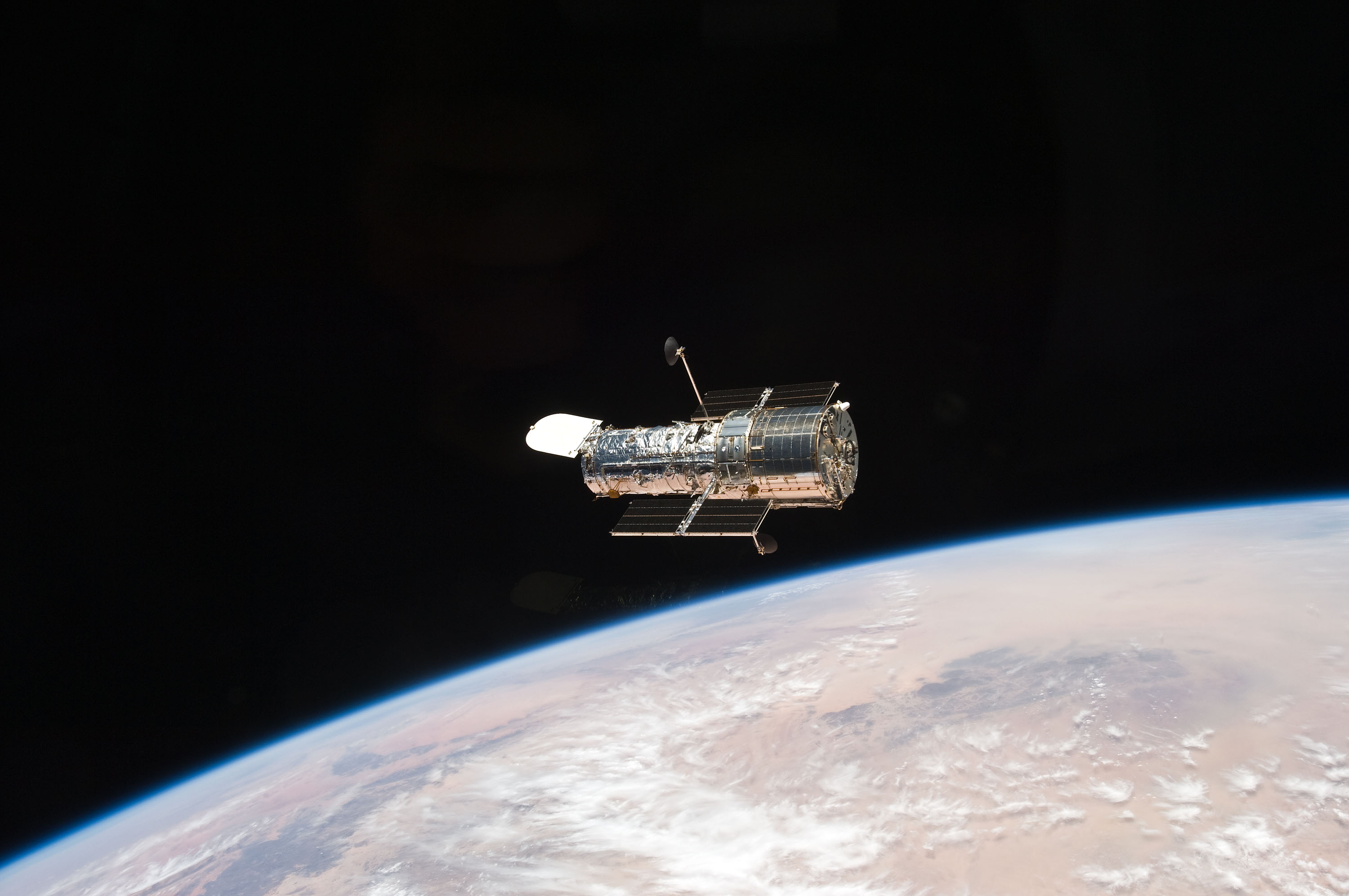
The Hubble Space Telescope in Low Earth Orbit

Launched primarily in the 1990s and early 2000s, the Great Observatories program comprises some of NASA's most powerful astrophysical tools. The Hubble Space Telescope was launched in 1990 via Discovery on STS-31 and proved capable of viewing galaxies 15 billion light-years away. Although a major manufacturing defect in the telescope's primary mirror threatened to cripple the mission, NASA initially compensated using computer enhancement and later flew five Space Shuttle servicing missions to install corrective optics and upgrade components. The Compton Gamma Ray Observatory was launched by Atlantis on STS-37 in 1991, identifying a possible source of antimatter at the center of the Milky Way and confirming that the majority of gamma-ray bursts occur outside our galaxy. The Chandra X-ray Observatory was deployed from Columbia on STS-93 in 1999, studying black holes, quasars, supernovae, and dark matter. It provided critical observations of the Sagittarius A* black hole at the center of the Milky Way and observed the separation of dark and regular matter during galactic collisions. Finally, the Spitzer Space Telescope, an infrared observatory, launched in 2003 on a Delta II rocket. Placed in an Earth-trailing orbit around the Sun, it contributed to the discovery and study of brown dwarfs and exoplanets.

Other telescopes, such as the Cosmic Background Explorer and the Wilkinson Microwave Anisotropy Probe, gathered robust evidence supporting the Big Bang theory. The James Webb Space Telescope, named after the NASA administrator who led the Apollo program, is a sophisticated infrared observatory launched in 2021. Designed as a direct successor to Hubble, it is optimized to observe the formation of the first galaxies in the universe. Further initiatives include the Kepler space telescope, launched in 2009 to identify exoplanets that may be potentially habitable. Kepler notably confirmed Kepler-22b, its first discovery orbiting within the habitable zone of its host star.

NASA has also launched numerous satellites dedicated to studying Earth, including the Television Infrared Observation Satellite (TIROS) in 1960, which operated as the first weather satellite. NASA collaborated closely with the US Weather Bureau on subsequent TIROS missions and the second-generation Nimbus program. It expanded its Earth science portfolio through partnerships with the Environmental Science Services Administration and by fielding experimental Applications Technology Satellites in geosynchronous orbit. NASA's first dedicated Earth observation satellite, Landsat, launched in 1972. This long-standing focus ultimately led to NASA and the National Oceanic and Atmospheric Administration jointly developing the Geostationary Operational Environmental Satellite network and contributing to the global discovery of ozone depletion.

=== Space Shuttle ===
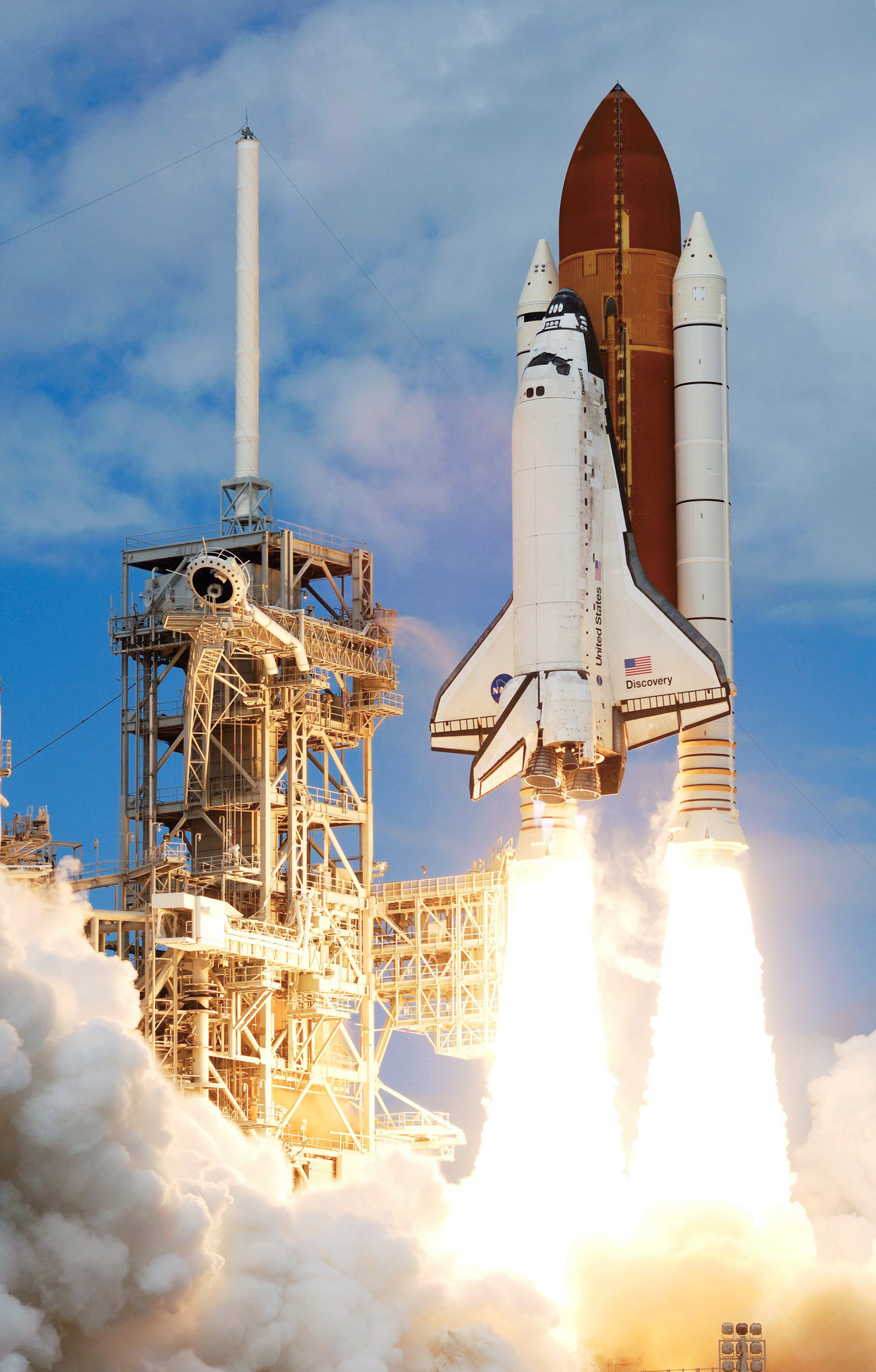
Launch of the Space Shuttle Discovery on STS-120

NASA had pursued spaceplane development since the 1960s, seeking to blend its dual aeronautics and spaceflight mandates. NASA viewed a spaceplane as part of a broader architectural program designed to provide routine and economical logistical support to a future space station in Earth orbit, which would, in turn, serve as a hub for lunar and Mars missions. An operational, reusable launch vehicle was expected to end reliance on expensive, expendable boosters like the Saturn V.

In 1969, NASA designated the Johnson Space Center as the lead facility for the design, development, and manufacturing of the Space Shuttle orbiter, while the Marshall Space Flight Center led the development of the launch system. Insights gained from NASA's series of lifting body aircraft, culminating in the joint NASA–Air Force Martin Marietta X-24, directly informed the Space Shuttle's aerodynamic design. Official development began in 1972, with Rockwell International contracted to design the orbiter and engines, Martin Marietta producing the external fuel tank, and Morton Thiokol creating the solid rocket boosters. NASA eventually acquired six orbiters: Enterprise (for atmospheric testing), Columbia, Challenger, Discovery, Atlantis, and Endeavour.

The Space Shuttle program allowed NASA to significantly evolve its Astronaut Corps. While nearly all early astronauts were military test pilots, the Shuttle's diverse operational needs led NASA to recruit civilian scientific and technical experts. Notably, Sally Ride became the first American woman in space aboard STS-7. The revised astronaut selection framework also allowed NASA to include exchange astronauts from US allies and international partners for the first time.

The first orbital Space Shuttle flight occurred in 1981 when Columbia launched on the STS-1 mission, serving as a critical flight test for the new system. NASA initially intended for the Space Shuttle to fully replace expendable launch vehicles such as the Air Force's Atlas, Delta, and Titan, as well as the European Space Agency's Ariane rockets. The Shuttle's Spacelab payload module, developed by the ESA, drastically increased NASA's on-orbit scientific capabilities compared to prior eras.

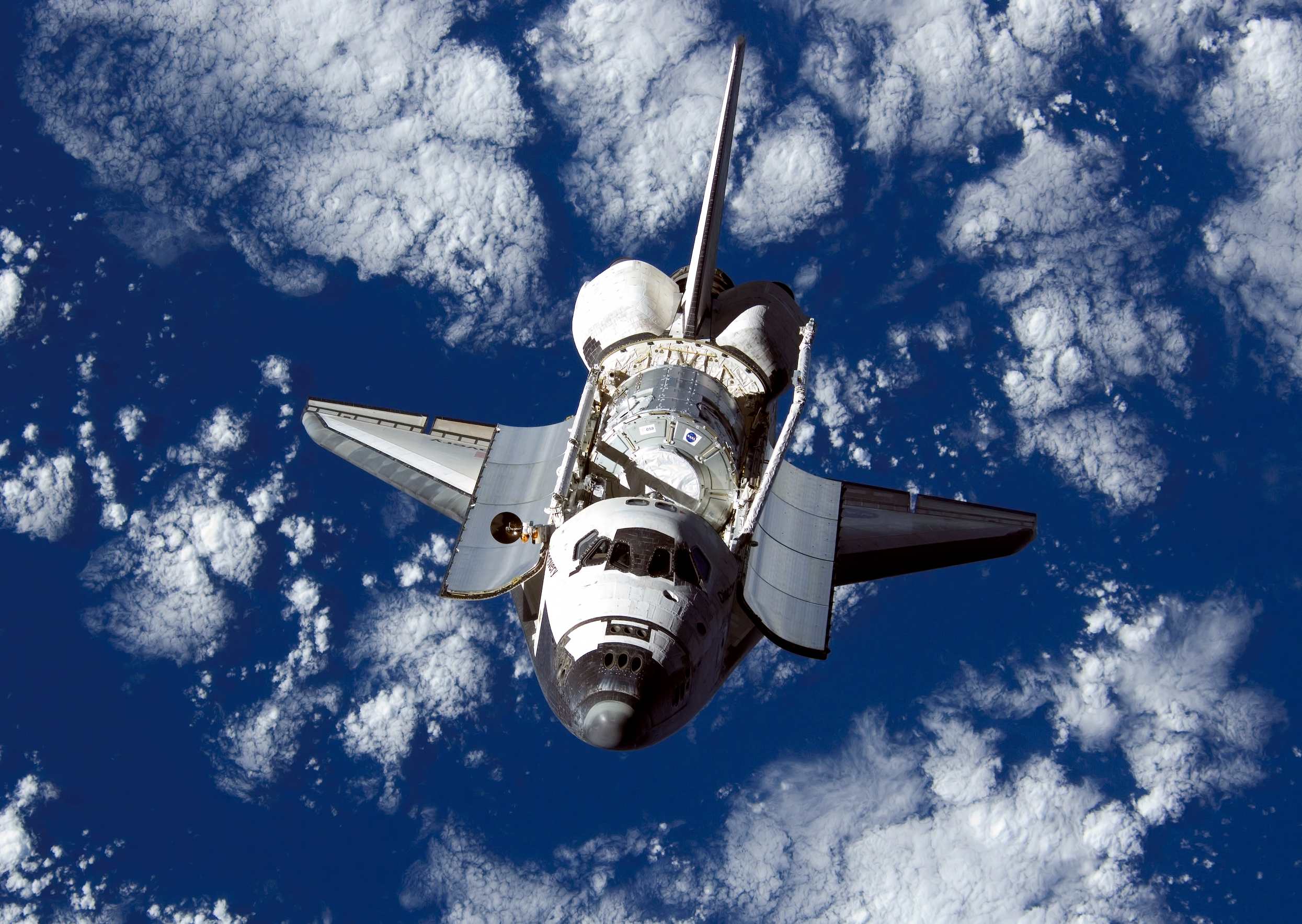
Space Shuttle Discovery in Low Earth Orbit on STS-120

NASA successfully launched commercial satellites on STS-5, and in 1984, the STS-41-C mission conducted the world's first on-orbit satellite servicing operation when Challenger captured and repaired the malfunctioning Solar Maximum Mission satellite. The Space Shuttle could also retrieve malfunctioning satellites—like Palapa B2 and Westar 6—and return them to Earth, where they were repaired and eventually relaunched.

Despite ushering in an era where NASA could frequently contract launch services for commercial companies, the Space Shuttle drew significant criticism for failing to be as cost-effective or rapidly reusable as initially advertised. In 1986, the Challenger disaster during the STS-51L mission resulted in the tragic loss of the orbiter and all seven astronauts, grounding the entire fleet for 36 months. This forced the 44 commercial companies that had contracted with NASA to revert to using expendable launch vehicles. When the Space Shuttle resumed flights with the STS-26 mission, the program had undergone stringent modifications to enhance safety and reliability.

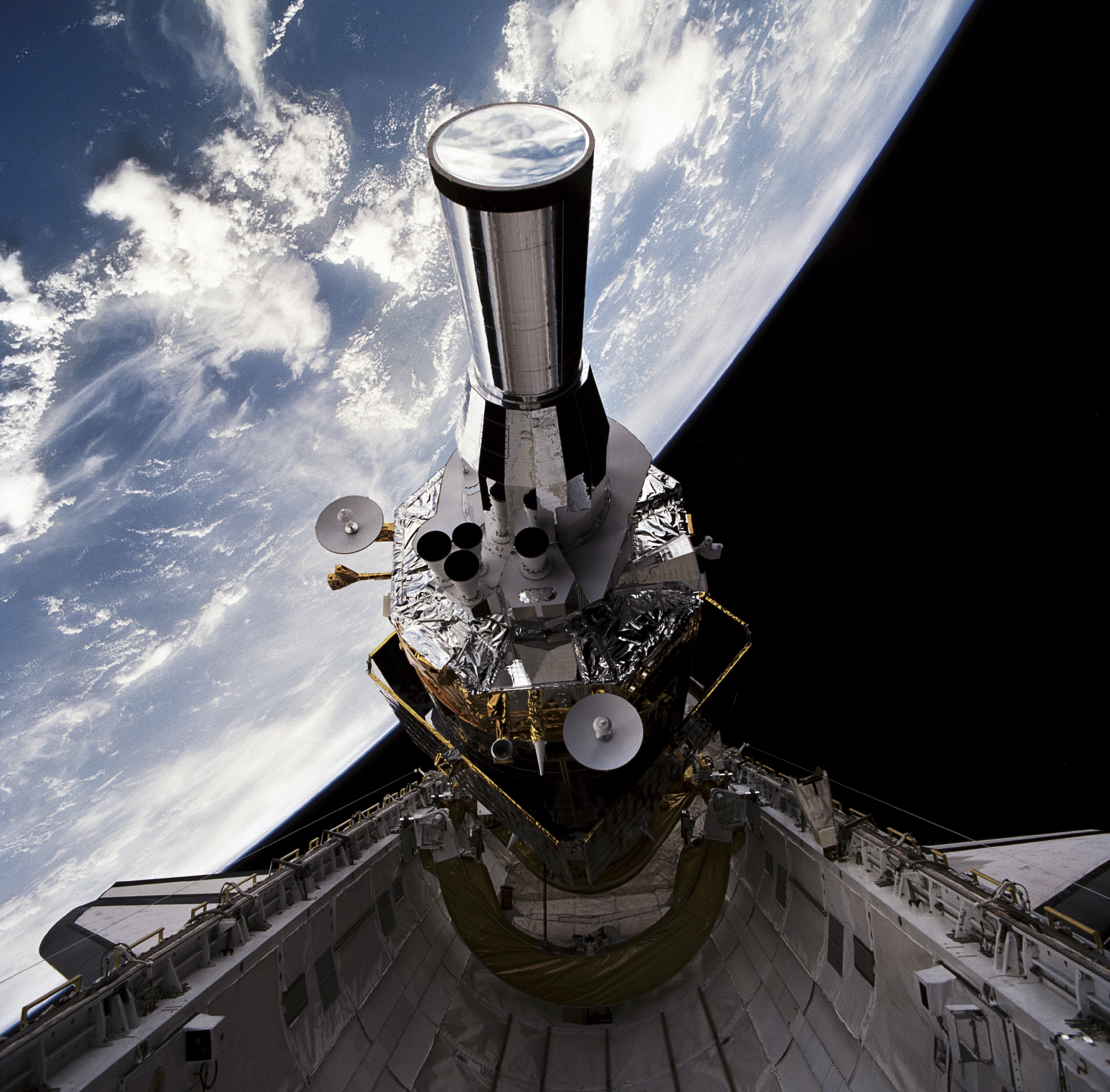
An Air Force Space Command Defense Support Program missile warning spacecraft deploys from the Space Shuttle Atlantis on the STS-44 mission

Following the collapse of the Soviet Union, the Russian Federation and the United States initiated the Shuttle–Mir program. The first Russian cosmonaut to fly on a Shuttle participated in the STS-60 mission in 1994, and Discovery performed a historic rendezvous—but did not dock—with the Russian space station Mir during STS-63. This was followed by Atlantis's STS-71 mission, achieving the Space Shuttle's long-intended goal of docking with a space station to transfer supplies and personnel. The Shuttle–Mir program continued until 1998, when an aging infrastructure and a series of orbital accidents aboard the Russian station brought it to an end.

In 2003, a second orbiter was lost when Columbia disintegrated upon reentry during the STS-107 mission, resulting in the deaths of all seven astronauts. This tragedy marked the beginning of the end for the program, with President George W. Bush directing that the Space Shuttle be retired upon the completion of the ISS. The fleet returned to flight in 2006, executing critical missions to assemble the ISS and perform a final servicing of the Hubble Space Telescope. The Space Shuttle program concluded entirely after the STS-135 resupply mission in 2011.

=== Space stations ===
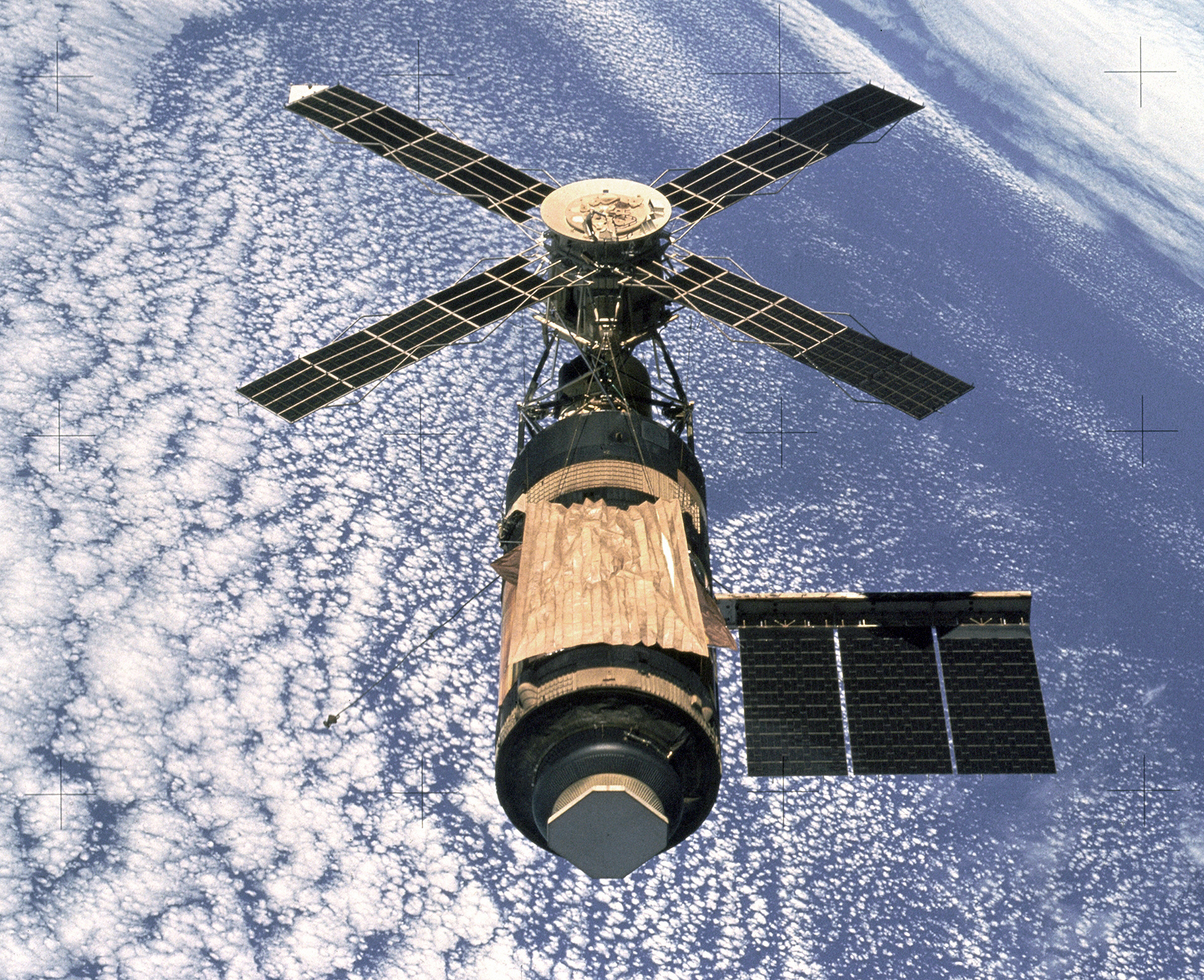
Skylab seen on the Skylab 4 mission

NASA never abandoned the concept of a permanent orbital laboratory following Skylab's reentry in 1979. As soon as the Space Shuttle became operational, the agency began lobbying for political support to build a larger space station, framing it as an orbital research hub, repair depot, and staging point for deep-space missions. NASA found a strong proponent in President Ronald Reagan, who stated in a 1984 speech:

America has always been greatest when we dared to be great. We can reach for greatness again. We can follow our dreams to distant stars, living and working in space for peaceful, economic, and scientific gain. Tonight I am directing NASA to develop a permanently manned space station and to do it within a decade.

In 1985, NASA proposed Space Station Freedom, which both the agency and President Reagan intended to be an international effort. While international collaboration offered political legitimacy, elements within NASA hesitated to work with domestic or foreign partners as true equals, and there were significant concerns over sharing sensitive space technologies with Europe. Nevertheless, an international agreement to develop Freedom was signed in 1985 with thirteen nations, including European Space Agency (ESA) member states, Canada, and Japan.

Despite its landmark status as the first truly international space endeavor, Space Station Freedom proved highly controversial, primarily due to escalating costs. Several sweeping redesigns in the early 1990s stripped the proposed station of many intended functions. Despite congressional pressure to cancel the program, it survived largely because, by 1992, it supported 75,000 aerospace jobs across 39 states. In 1993, the administration of President Bill Clinton sought to heavily reduce NASA's budget while protecting those jobs by directing that the station integrate the Russian Federation into the design.

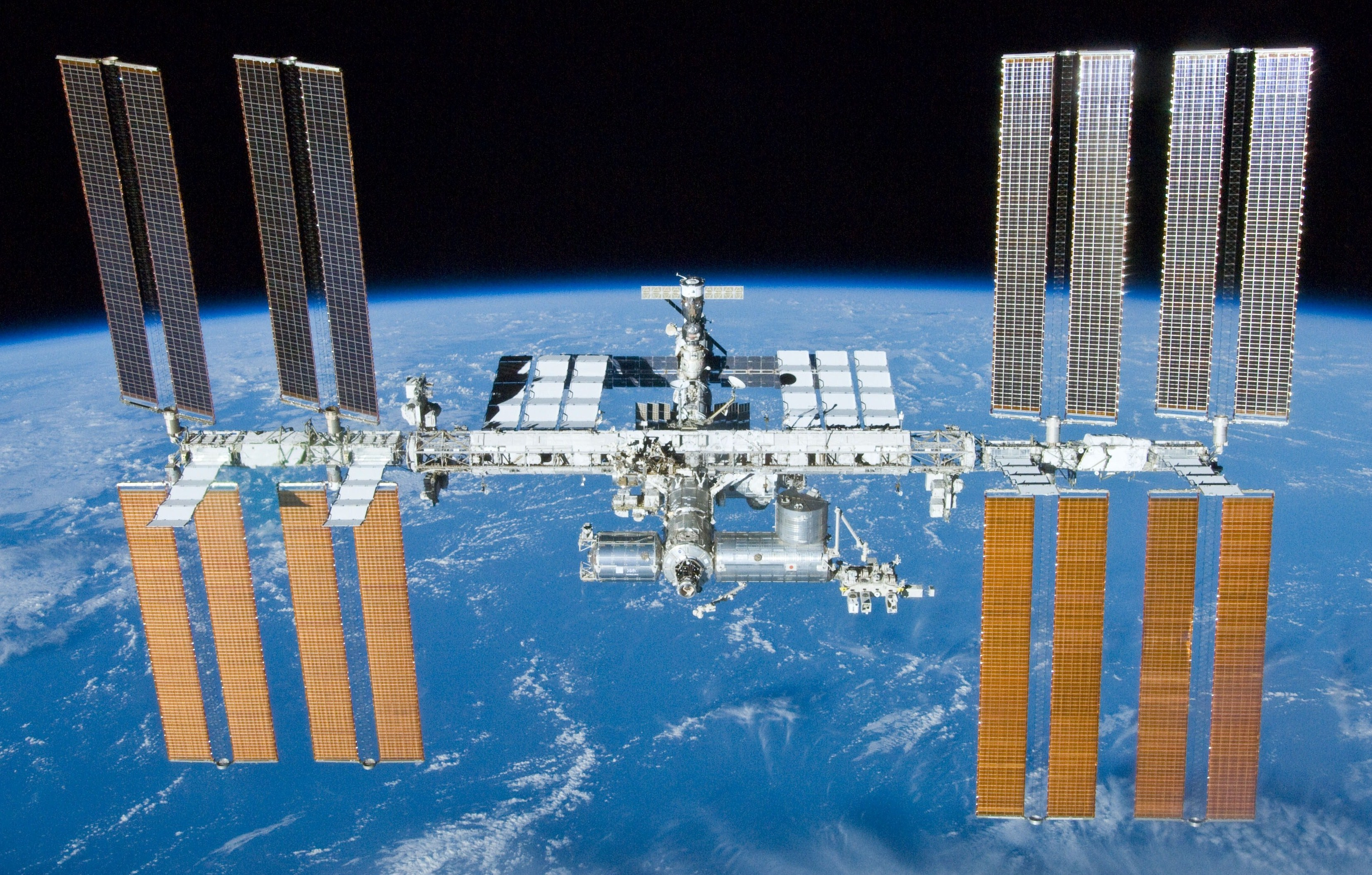
The International Space Station (ISS) seen from the Space Shuttle Atlantis on the STS-132 mission

Consequently, the Clinton Administration announced in 1993 that Space Station Freedom would be absorbed into what became the ISS program via a bilateral agreement with Russia. This infusion of American currency allowed Russia to preserve its faltering space sector post-Cold War and maintain its status as a premier spaceflight power. While the US financed and constructed the majority of the ISS, Russia, Canada, Japan, and the ESA provided critical hardware and modules. Though NASA initially projected costs to remain at $17.4 billion, budget overruns continually forced the agency to transfer funds from other programs. Ultimately, the total developmental and construction cost of the station approached $150 billion, with the US funding roughly two-thirds. Following the Columbia disaster in 2003, NASA grew reliant on Russian Soyuz spacecraft for astronaut transport, and the retirement of the Space Shuttle in 2011 punctuated the transition to operational dependency until American commercial solutions matured.

Concurrently in the 1980s, NASA partnered with the Department of Defense to develop the Rockwell X-30 National Aerospace Plane. Recognizing that the Space Shuttle could not fulfill all of its economic and rapid-turnaround promises, NASA intended the X-30 to operate as a true single-stage-to-orbit spaceplane with both civil and military utility. With the end of the Cold War reducing defense spending, the X-30 was canceled in 1992 before achieving flight status.

=== Unleashing commercial space and returning to the Moon ===
In the aftermath of the 2003 Columbia disaster, President Bush introduced the Constellation program, designed to serve as a successor to the Space Shuttle and extend human spaceflight beyond low Earth orbit. Constellation sought to heavily leverage existing Shuttle technology and successfully return astronauts to the Moon. However, this program was later canceled under the Obama Administration. Prominent former astronauts, including Neil Armstrong, Gene Cernan, and Jim Lovell, strongly cautioned President Obama that failing to maintain strong human spaceflight capabilities risked relegating the United States to a second-tier space power.

To adapt, NASA increasingly looked to the private sector. Calls to involve commercial enterprises in orbital space operations had surfaced as early as the Reagan Administration. In the 1990s, NASA and Lockheed Martin partnered on the X-33 demonstrator for the VentureStar concept—a commercial spaceplane intended to replace the Shuttle. Though the project was canceled in 2001 due to severe technical difficulties, it marked the first instance of a commercial entity directly expending significant internal resources on an orbital launch system. Around this time, the reality of space tourism challenged NASA's assumption that orbital travel would remain an exclusively governmental domain. Notably, Dennis Tito, an American investment manager, contracted with Russia to spend four days on the ISS in 2001, overriding intense initial opposition from NASA.

Prominent figures like former astronaut Buzz Aldrin advocated strongly for expanding NASA's use of commercial partners, arguing it would free the agency to refocus on deep-space exploration and its historical roots in research and development. Embracing this highly efficient commercial approach, NASA introduced the Commercial Resupply Services program to manage ISS logistics, and later the Commercial Crew Program. SpaceX emerged as a vital partner in this shift; with the launch of the SpaceX Crew-1 mission in 2020, SpaceX successfully restored America's human spaceflight capability, ending nearly a decade of domestic reliance on Russian vehicles.

Looking beyond low Earth orbit, NASA formally announced the Artemis program in 2019, targeting a return of humans to the Moon and the establishment of a sustainable lunar presence. The technological effort was paired diplomatically with the Artemis Accords, which seek to build a coalition of partner nations adhering to established norms for the commercial and peaceful use of lunar space.

To organize this multifaceted deep-space strategy, NASA established the Moon to Mars Program Office in 2023. The office actively oversees hardware architectures, international mission planning, and science objectives associated with establishing long-term operations on the Moon and subsequently exploring Mars.

== Active programs ==
=== Human spaceflight ===
==== International Space Station (1993–present) ====
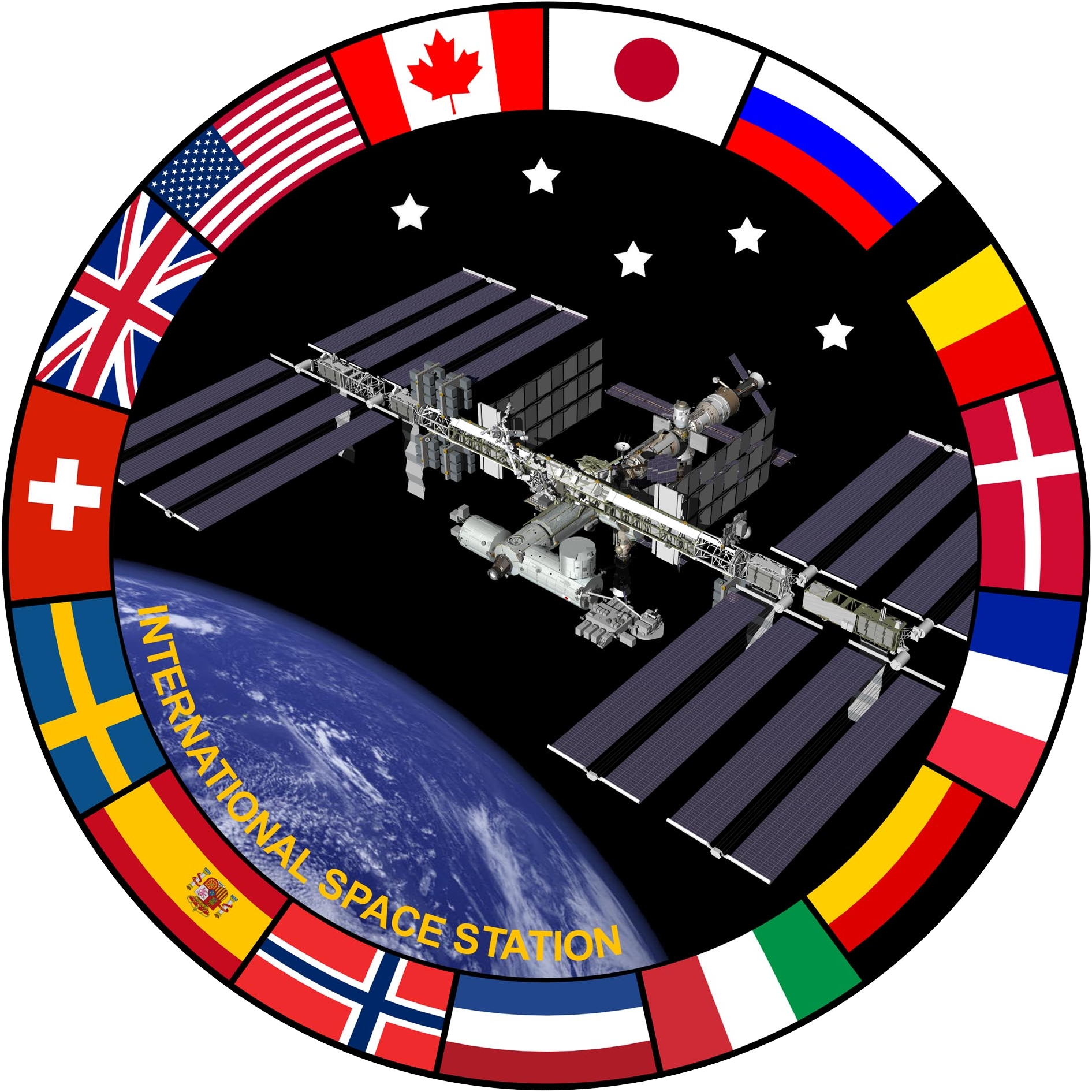

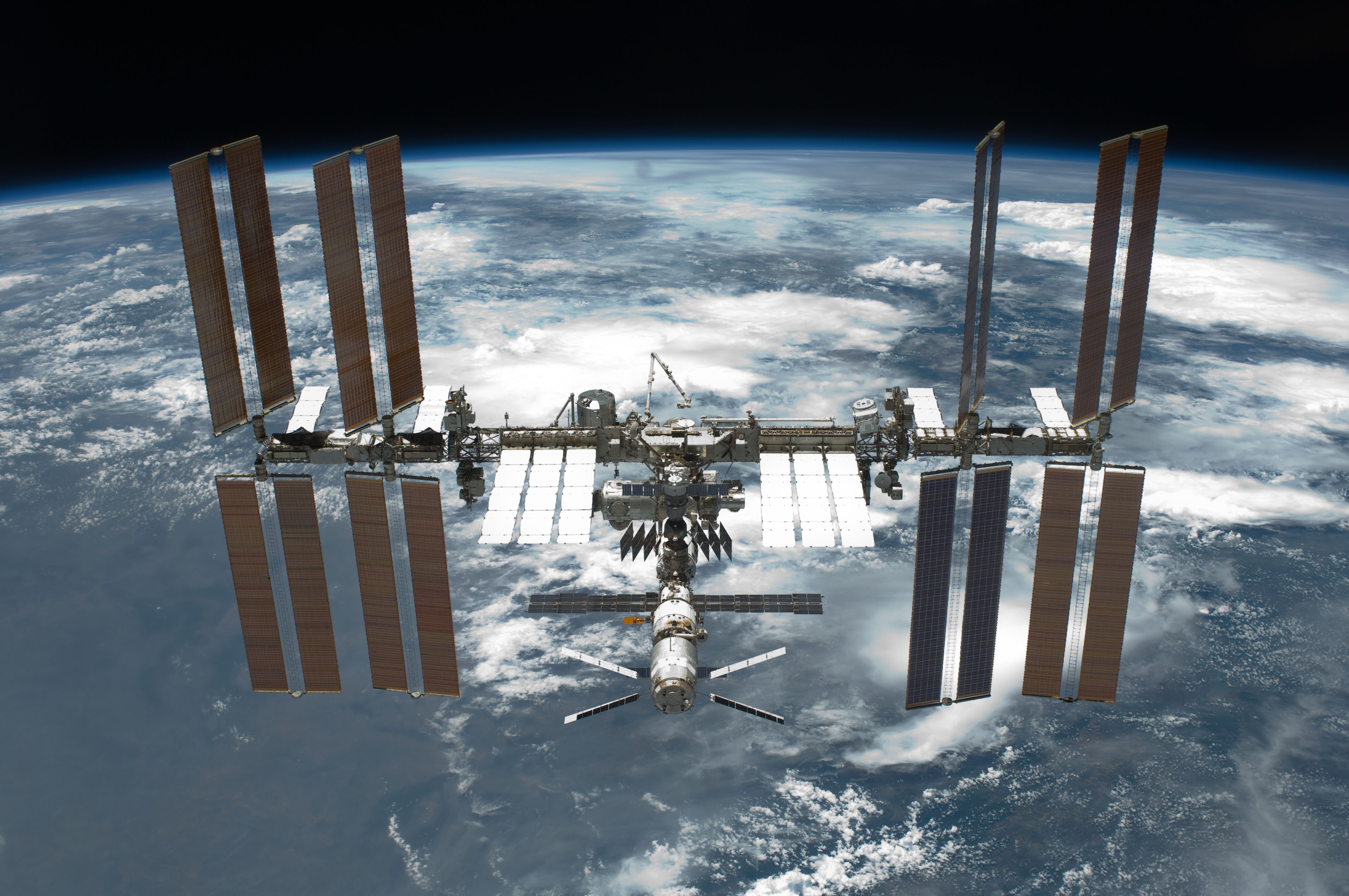
The International Space Station as seen from Space Shuttle Endeavour during STS-134

The International Space Station (ISS) represents a fusion of NASA's initial Space Station Freedom project with the Russian Mir-2 program, the European Columbus initiative, and the Japanese Kibō laboratory. Though NASA planned in the 1980s to develop Freedom unilaterally, domestic budget constraints forced a merger of these concepts into a single multi-national effort in 1993. The program is managed jointly by NASA, the Russian Federal Space Agency (Roscosmos), the Japan Aerospace Exploration Agency (JAXA), the European Space Agency (ESA), and the Canadian Space Agency (CSA). The station is constructed of multiple pressurized modules, large external trusses, solar arrays, and diverse scientific components manufactured globally and delivered to orbit by Russian Proton and Soyuz rockets alongside the American Space Shuttle. Orbital assembly began in 1998; the core US Orbital Segment was completed by 2009, with the Russian Orbital Segment achieving its primary assembly phase by 2010. Operations and habitation are governed by international treaties, granting Russia full ownership over its segment (excluding the early, US-funded Zarya module), while allocating the US Orbital Segment collaboratively among NASA and the other partners.

Long-duration assignments aboard the station are classified as ISS Expeditions. Expedition crews historically spend roughly six months in orbit. Originally set at three, crew numbers temporarily decreased to two following the Columbia disaster before returning to and expanding to six residents by 2009. Following the successful introduction of the robust Commercial Crew capsules—which comfortably transport four crewmembers each—long-duration expeditions frequently support larger staffing contingents. The ISS has been continuously inhabited since November 2000, eclipsing the previous occupancy record set by Mir, and has hosted travelers from over 15 nations.

The station can be seen from the Earth with the naked eye and, as of 2026, is the largest artificial satellite in Earth orbit with a mass and volume greater than that of any previous space station. The Russian Soyuz and American Dragon and Starliner spacecraft are used to send astronauts to and from the ISS. Several uncrewed cargo spacecraft provide service to the ISS; they are the Russian Progress spacecraft which has done so since 2000, the European Automated Transfer Vehicle (ATV) since 2008, the Japanese H-II Transfer Vehicle (HTV) since 2009, the (uncrewed) Dragon since 2012, and the American Cygnus spacecraft since 2013. The Space Shuttle, before its retirement, was also used for cargo transfer and would often switch out expedition crew members, although it did not have the capability to remain docked for the duration of their stay. Between the retirement of the Shuttle in 2011 and the commencement of crewed Dragon flights in 2020, American astronauts exclusively used the Soyuz for crew transport to and from the ISS. The highest number of people occupying the ISS has been thirteen; this occurred three times during the late Shuttle ISS assembly missions.

The ISS program is expected to continue until 2030, after which the space station will be retired and destroyed in a controlled de-orbit.

==== Commercial Resupply Services (2008–present) ====
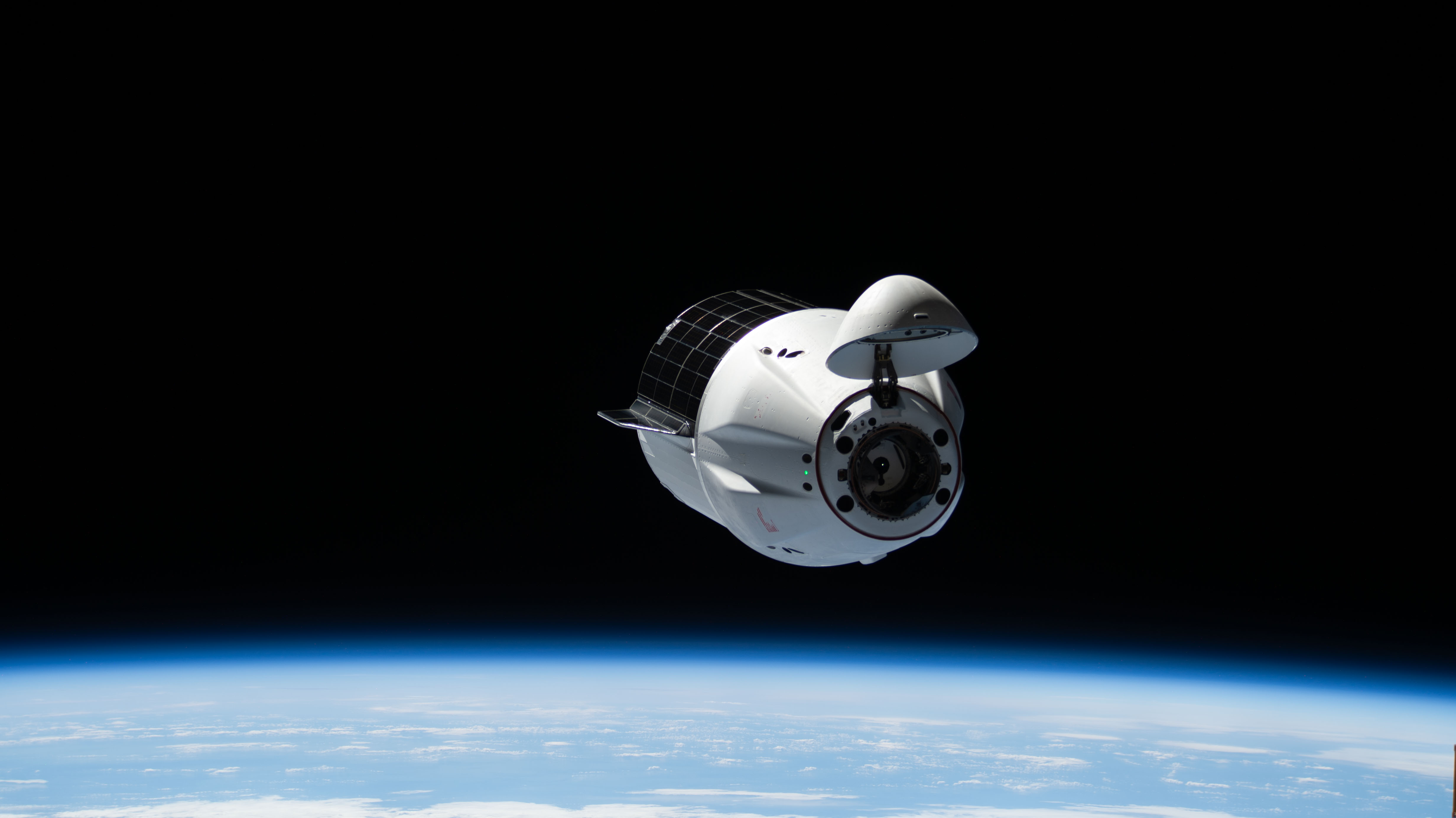
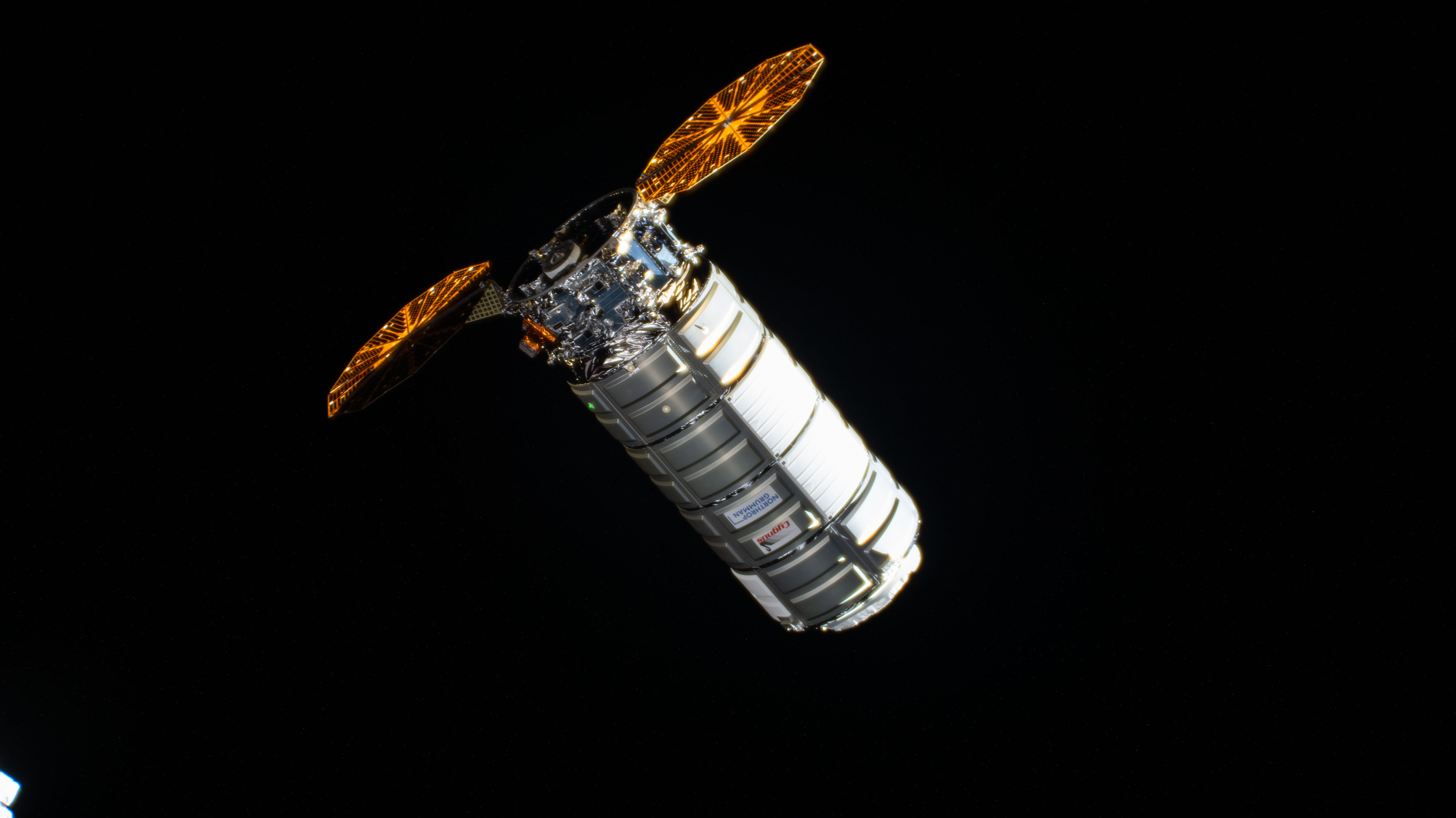
Dragon 2 (left) and Cygnus XL (right), the two active Commercial Resupply Services spacecraft

Commercial Resupply Services (CRS) are a contract solution to deliver cargo and supplies to the International Space Station on a commercial basis by private companies. NASA signed its first CRS contracts in 2008 and awarded $1.6 billion to SpaceX for twelve cargo Dragon and $1.9 billion to Orbital Sciences (Note: Orbital Sciences was awarded a CRS contract in 2008. In 2015, Orbital Sciences became Orbital ATK through a business merger. Orbital ATK was awarded a CRS-2 contract in 2016. In 2018, Orbital ATK was acquired by Northrop Grumman.) for eight Cygnus flights, covering deliveries until 2016. Both companies evolved or created their launch vehicle products to launch the spacecraft (SpaceX with The Falcon 9 and Orbital with the Antares).

SpaceX flew its first operational resupply mission (SpaceX CRS-1) in 2012. Orbital Sciences followed in 2014 (Cygnus CRS Orb-1). In 2015, NASA extended CRS-1 to twenty flights for SpaceX and twelve flights for Orbital ATK.

A second phase of contracts (known as CRS-2) was solicited in 2014; contracts were awarded in January 2016 to Orbital ATK Cygnus, Sierra Nevada Corporation Dream Chaser, and SpaceX Dragon 2, for cargo transport flights beginning in 2019 and expected to last through 2024. In March 2022, NASA awarded an additional six CRS-2 missions each to both SpaceX and Northrop Grumman (formerly Orbital).

Northrop Grumman successfully delivered Cygnus NG-17 to the ISS in February 2022. In July 2022, SpaceX launched its 25th CRS flight (SpaceX CRS-25) and successfully delivered its cargo to the ISS. The Dream Chaser spacecraft is currently scheduled for its Demo-1 launch in the first half of 2024.

==== Commercial Crew Program (2011–present) ====
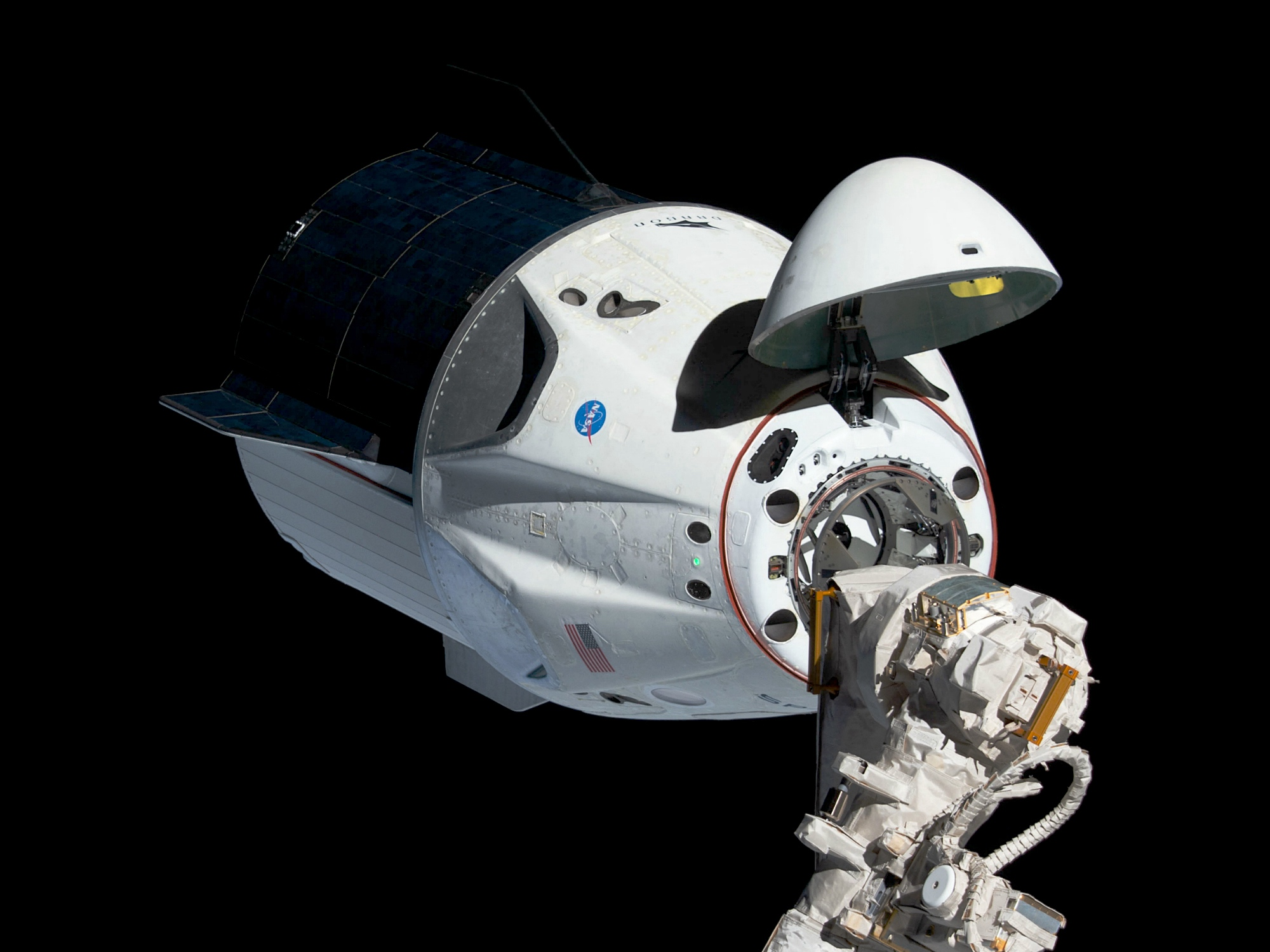
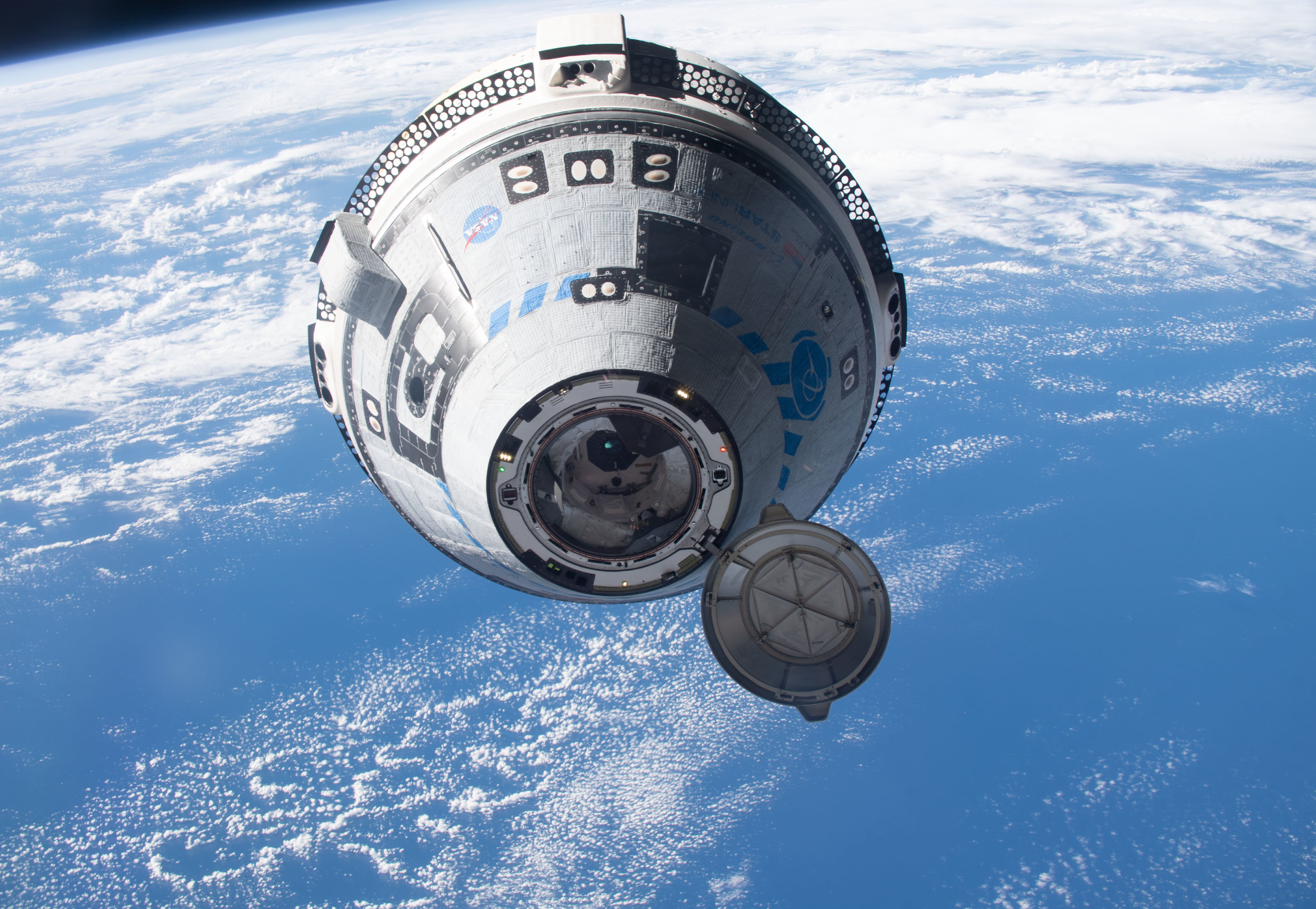
The Crew Dragon (left) and Starliner (right) approaching the ISS on their respective missions

The Commercial Crew Program (CCP) provides commercially operated crew transportation service to and from the International Space Station (ISS) under contract to NASA, conducting crew rotations between the expeditions of the International Space Station program. American space manufacturer SpaceX began providing service in 2020, using the Crew Dragon spacecraft, while Boeing's Starliner spacecraft provided service in 2024. It was on contract for 6 missions, but after the first mission nearly ended in disaster and left the two astronauts stranded on the ISS for six months, NASA froze its contract with Boeing. NASA has contracted for six operational missions from Boeing and fourteen from SpaceX, ensuring sufficient support for ISS through 2030.

The spacecraft are owned and operated by the vendor, and crew transportation is provided to NASA as a commercial service. Each mission sends up to four astronauts to the ISS, with an option for a fifth passenger available. Operational flights occur approximately once every six months for missions that last for approximately six months. A spacecraft remains docked to the ISS during its mission, and missions usually overlap by at least a few days. Between the retirement of the Space Shuttle in 2011 and the first operational CCP mission in 2020, NASA relied on the Soyuz program to transport its astronauts to the ISS.

A Crew Dragon spacecraft is launched to space atop a Falcon 9 Block 5 launch vehicle and the capsule returns to Earth via splashdown in the ocean near Florida. The program's first operational mission, SpaceX Crew-1, launched on November 16, 2020. Boeing Starliner operational flights will now commence with Boeing Starliner-1 which will launched atop an Atlas V N22 launch vehicle. Instead of a splashdown, Starliner capsules return on land with airbags at one of four designated sites in the western US.

==== Artemis (2017–present) ====

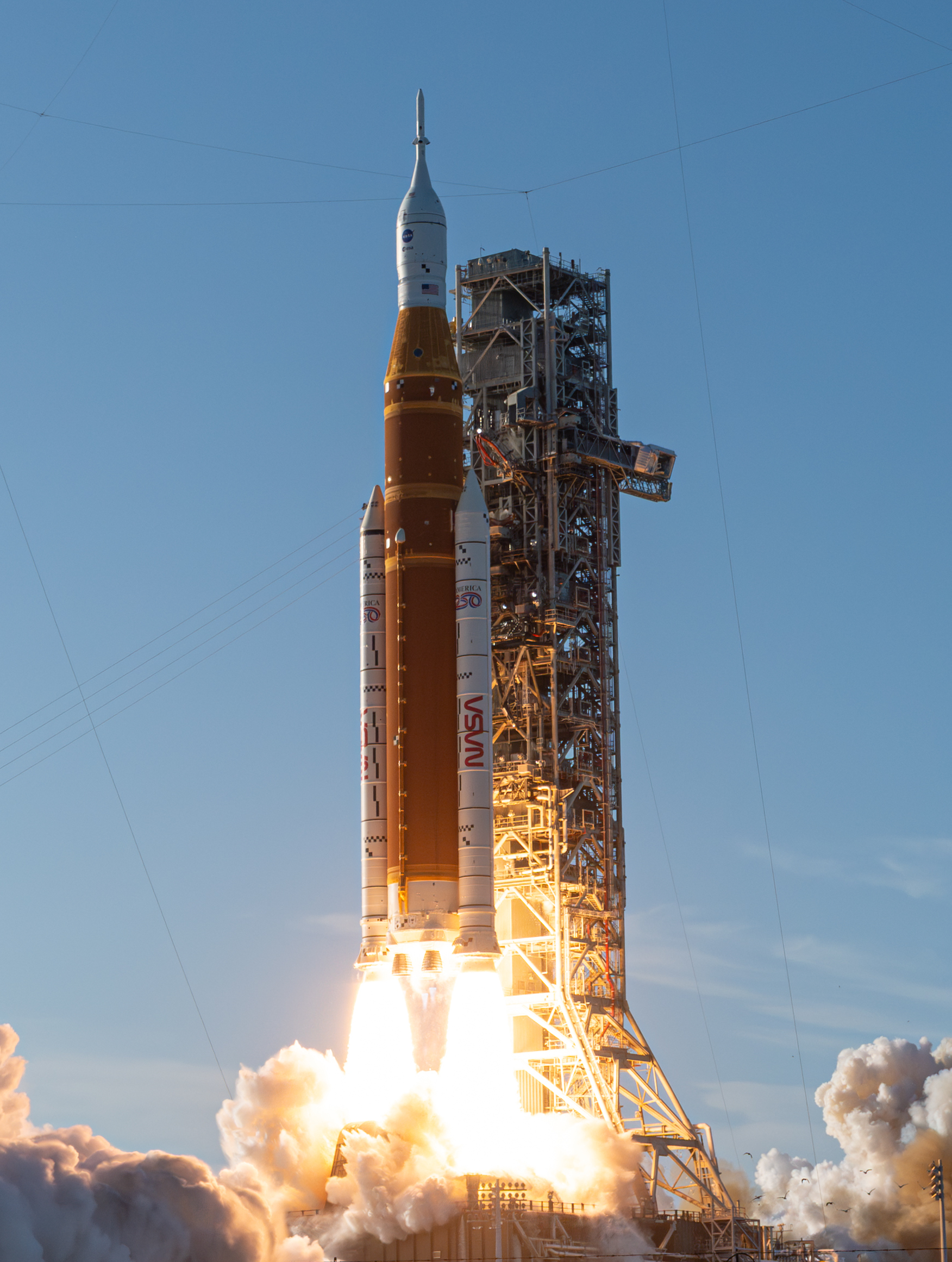
Launch of Artemis II

Since 2017, NASA's crewed spaceflight program has been the Artemis program, which involves the help of US commercial spaceflight companies and international partners such as ESA, JAXA, and Canadian Space Agency. Artemis would be the first step towards the long-term goal of establishing a sustainable presence on the Moon, laying the foundation for companies to build a lunar economy, and eventually sending humans to Mars.

The Orion Crew Exploration Vehicle was held over from the canceled Constellation program for Artemis. Artemis I was the uncrewed initial launch of Space Launch System (SLS) that would also send an Orion spacecraft on a Distant Retrograde Orbit.

The first step toward returning astronauts to the Moon, Artemis II, briefly placed a crew of four into a lunar flyby in April 2026. Artemis III, planned for mid-2027, was originally planned to conduct the first crewed lunar landing since Apollo 17; in February 2026, the mission was changed to a low Earth orbit docking test of Orion. The landing was pushed to Artemis IV, planned for early 2028.

In support of the Artemis missions, NASA has been funding private companies to land robotic probes on the lunar surface in a program known as the Commercial Lunar Payload Services. As of March 2022, NASA has awarded contracts for robotic lunar probes to companies such as Intuitive Machines, Firefly Space Systems, and Astrobotic.

On April 16, 2021, NASA announced they had selected Spacex's Starship HLS as its Human Landing System. The agency's Space Launch System rocket will launch four astronauts aboard the Orion spacecraft for their multi-day journey to lunar orbit where they will transfer to SpaceX's Starship for the final leg of their journey to the surface of the Moon.

Until 2026, NASA additionally planned the construction of the Lunar Gateway, a small space station in lunar orbit designed primarily for non-continuous human habitation. In March 2026, NASA canceled the project in favor of a Moon Base.

In 2017, NASA was directed by the congressional NASA Transition Authorization Act of 2017 to get humans to Mars-orbit (or to the Martian surface) by the 2030s.

==== Commercial LEO Development (2021–present) ====
The Commercial Low Earth Orbit Destinations program is an initiative by NASA to support work on commercial space stations that the agency hopes to have in place by the end of the current decade to replace the "International Space Station". The three selected companies are: Blue Origin (et al.) with their Orbital Reef station concept, Nanoracks (et al.) with their Starlab Space Station concept, and Northrop Grumman with a station concept based on the HALO-module for the Gateway station.

=== Robotic exploration ===
Video of many of the uncrewed missions used to explore the outer reaches of space

NASA has conducted many uncrewed and robotic spaceflight programs throughout its history. More than 1,000 uncrewed missions have been designed to explore the Earth and the Solar System.

==== Mission selection process ====
NASA executes a mission development framework to plan, select, develop, and operate robotic missions. This framework defines cost, schedule and technical risk parameters to enable competitive selection of missions involving mission candidates that have been developed by principal investigators and their teams from across NASA, the broader US Government research and development stakeholders, and industry. The mission development construct is defined by four umbrella programs.

===== Explorer program =====
The Explorer program derives its origin from the earliest days of the US Space program. In current form, the program consists of three classes of systems: Small, Medium, and University-Class Explorers missions. The NASA Explorer program office provides frequent flight opportunities for moderate cost innovative solutions from the heliophysics and astrophysics science areas. The Small Explorer missions are required to limit cost to NASA to below $150M (2022 dollars). Medium class explorer missions have typically involved NASA cost caps of $350M. The Explorer program office is based at NASA Goddard Space Flight Center.

===== Discovery program =====
The NASA Discovery program develops and delivers robotic spacecraft solutions in the planetary science domain. Discovery enables scientists and engineers to assemble a team to deliver a solution against a defined set of objectives and competitively bid that solution against other candidate programs. Cost caps vary but recent mission selection processes were accomplished using a $500M cost cap for NASA. The Planetary Mission Program Office is based at the NASA Marshall Space Flight Center and manages both the Discovery and New Frontiers missions. The office is part of the Science Mission Directorate.

NASA Administrator Bill Nelson announced on June 2, 2021, that the DAVINCI+ and VERITAS missions were selected to launch to Venus in the late 2020s, having beat out competing proposals for missions to Jupiter's volcanic moon Io and Neptune's large moon Triton that were also selected as Discovery program finalists in early 2020. Each mission has an estimated cost of $500 million, with launches expected between 2028 and 2030. Launch contracts will be awarded later in each mission's development.

===== New Frontiers program =====
The New Frontiers program focuses on specific Solar System exploration goals identified as top priorities by the planetary science community. Primary objectives include Solar System exploration employing medium class spacecraft missions to conduct high-science-return investigations. New Frontiers builds on the development approach employed by the Discovery program but provides for higher cost caps and schedule durations than are available with Discovery. Cost caps vary by opportunity; recent missions have been awarded based on a defined cap of $1 billion. The higher cost cap and projected longer mission durations result in a lower frequency of new opportunities for the program – typically one every several years. OSIRIS-REx and New Horizons are examples of New Frontiers missions.

NASA has determined that the next opportunity to propose for the fifth round of New Frontiers missions will occur no later than the fall of 2024. Missions in NASA's New Frontiers Program tackle specific Solar System exploration goals identified as top priorities by the planetary science community. Exploring the Solar System with medium-class spacecraft missions that conduct high-science-return investigations is NASA's strategy to further understand the Solar System.

===== Large strategic missions =====
Large strategic missions (formerly called Flagship missions) are strategic missions that are typically developed and managed by large teams that may span several NASA centers. The individual missions become the program as opposed to being part of a larger effort (see Discovery, New Frontiers, etc.). The James Webb Space Telescope is a strategic mission that was developed over a period of more than 20 years. Strategic missions are developed on an ad-hoc basis as program objectives and priorities are established. Missions like Voyager, had they been developed today, would have been strategic missions. Three of the Great Observatories were strategic missions (the Chandra X-ray Observatory, the Compton Gamma Ray Observatory, and the Hubble Space Telescope). Europa Clipper is the next large strategic mission in development by NASA.

==== Planetary science missions ====
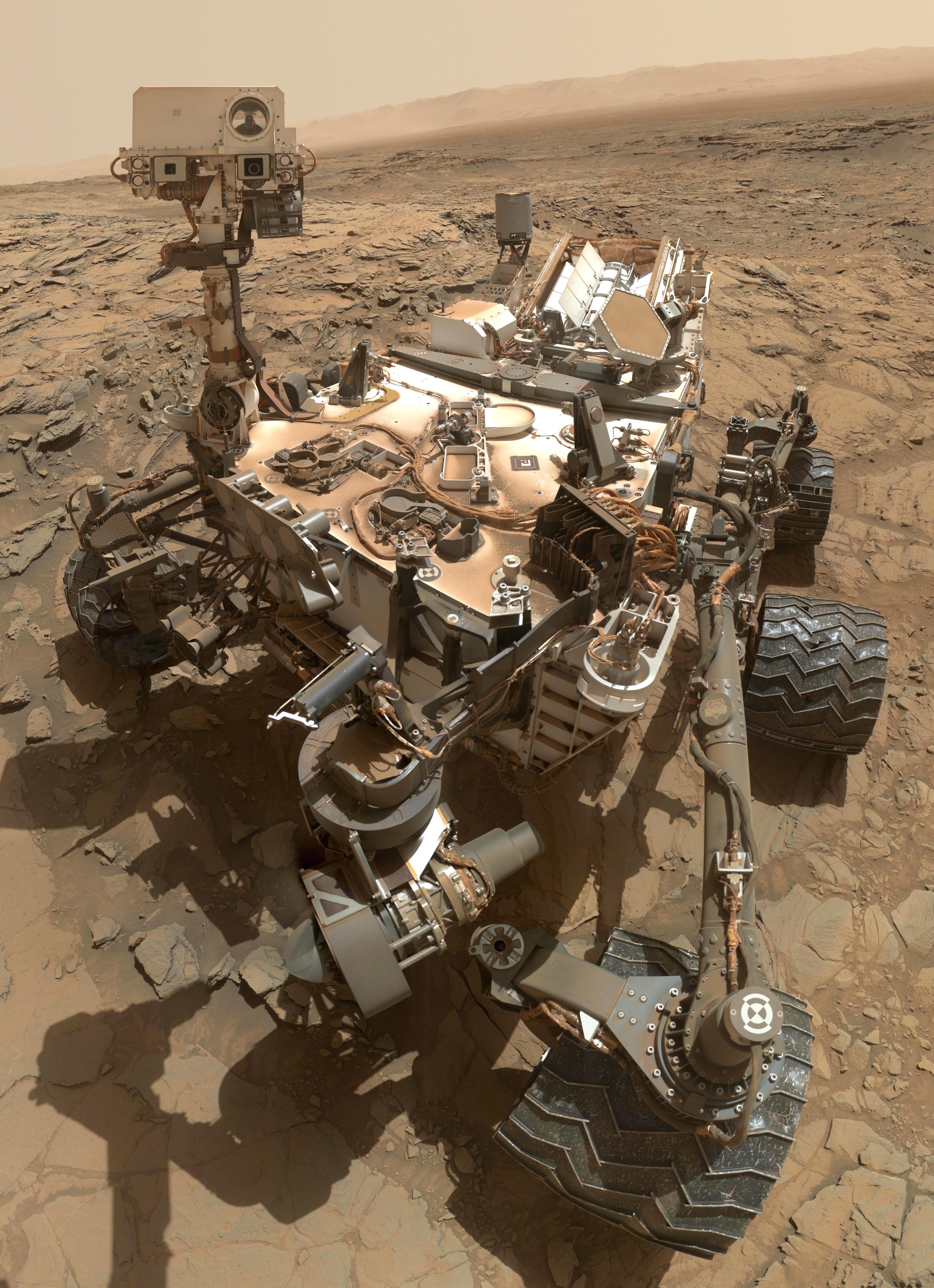
Curiosity on the surface of Mars

NASA continues to play a material role in exploration of the Solar System as it has for decades. Ongoing missions have current science objectives with respect to more than five extraterrestrial bodies within the Solar System – Moon (Lunar Reconnaissance Orbiter), Mars (Perseverance rover), Jupiter (Juno), asteroid Bennu (OSIRIS-REx), and Kuiper Belt Objects (New Horizons). The Juno extended mission will make multiple flybys of the Jovian moon Io in 2023 and 2024 after flybys of Ganymede in 2021 and Europa in 2022. Voyager 1 and Voyager 2 continue to provide science data back to Earth while continuing on their outward journeys into interstellar space.

On November 26, 2011, NASA's Mars Science Laboratory mission was successfully launched for Mars. The Curiosity rover successfully landed on Mars on August 6, 2012, and subsequently began its search for evidence of past or present life on Mars.

In September 2014, NASA's MAVEN spacecraft, which is part of the Mars Scout Program, successfully entered Mars orbit and, as of October 2022, continues its study of the atmosphere of Mars. NASA's ongoing Mars investigations include in-depth surveys of Mars by the Perseverance rover.

NASA's Europa Clipper, launched in October 2024, will study the Galilean moon Europa through a series of flybys while in orbit around Jupiter. Dragonfly will send a mobile robotic rotorcraft to Saturn's biggest moon, Titan. As of May 2021, Dragonfly is scheduled for launch in June 2027.

==== Astrophysics missions ====
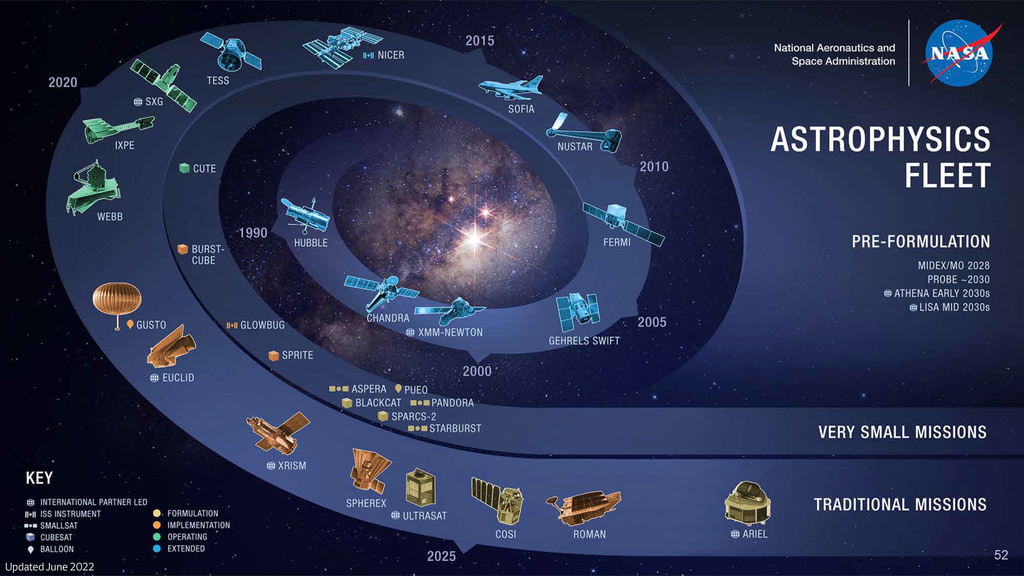
NASA astrophysics spacecraft fleet, credit NASA GSFC, 2022

The NASA Science Mission Directorate Astrophysics division manages the agency's astrophysics science portfolio. NASA has invested significant resources in the development, delivery, and operations of various forms of space telescopes. These telescopes have provided the means to study the cosmos over a large range of the electromagnetic spectrum.

The Great Observatories that were launched in the 1980s and 1990s have provided a wealth of observations for study by physicists across the planet. The first of them, the Hubble Space Telescope, was delivered to orbit in 1990 and continues to function, in part due to prior servicing missions performed by the Space Shuttle. The other remaining active great observatories include the Chandra X-ray Observatory (CXO), launched by STS-93 in July 1999 and is now in a 64-hour elliptical orbit studying X-ray sources that are not readily viewable from terrestrial observatories.

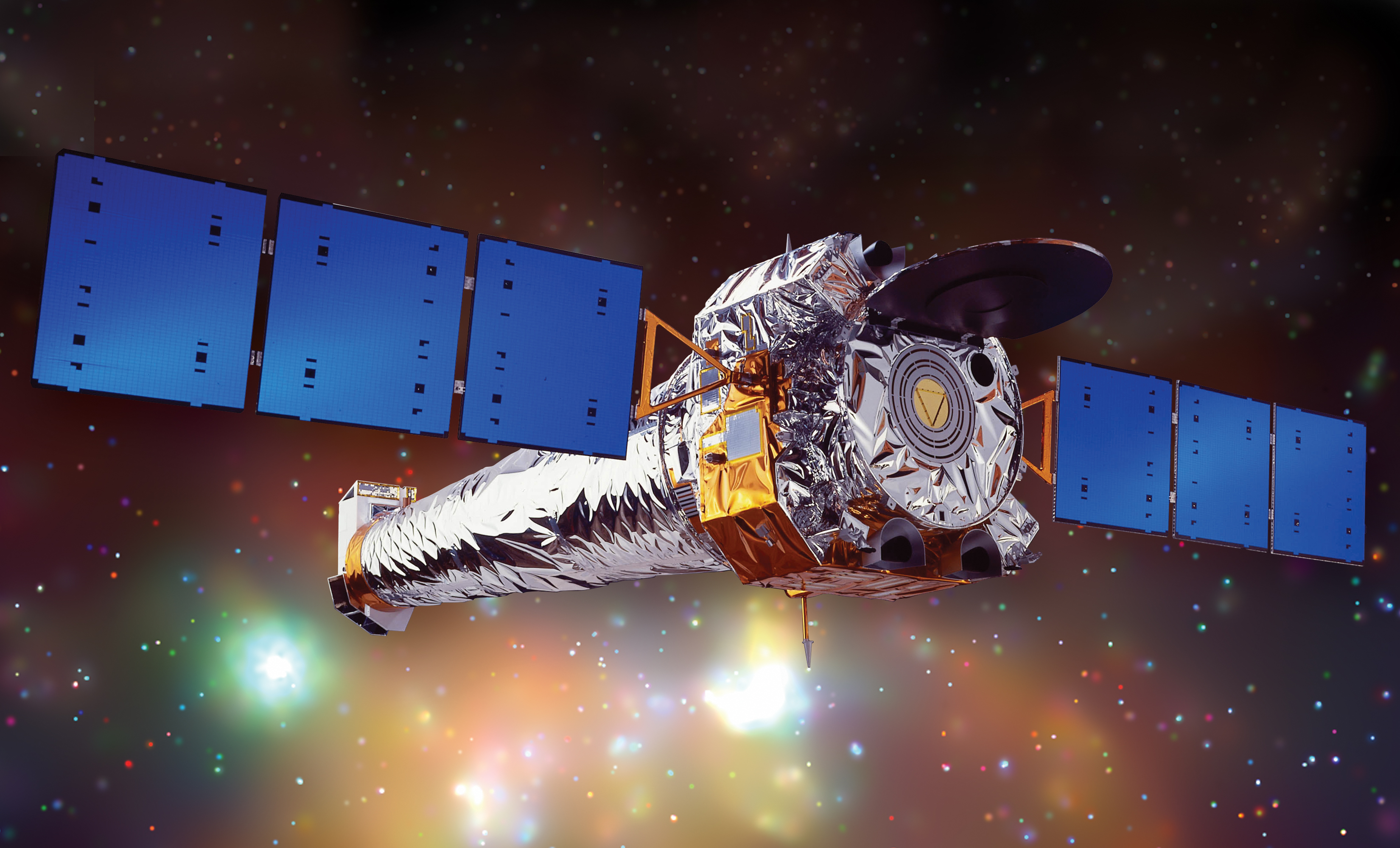
Chandra X-ray Observatory (rendering), 2015

The Imaging X-ray Polarimetry Explorer (IXPE) is a space observatory designed to improve the understanding of X-ray production in objects such as neutron stars and pulsar wind nebulae, as well as stellar and supermassive black holes. IXPE launched in December 2021 and is an international collaboration between NASA and the Italian Space Agency (ASI). It is part of the NASA Small Explorers program, which designs low-cost spacecraft to study heliophysics and astrophysics.

The Neil Gehrels Swift Observatory was launched in November 2004 and is a gamma-ray burst observatory that also monitors the afterglow in X-ray, and UV/Visible light at the location of a burst. The mission was developed in a joint partnership between Goddard Space Flight Center (GSFC) and an international consortium from the United States, United Kingdom, and Italy. Pennsylvania State University operates the mission as part of NASA's Medium Explorer program.

The Fermi Gamma-ray Space Telescope (FGST) is another gamma-ray focused space observatory that was launched to low Earth orbit in June 2008 and is being used to perform gamma-ray astronomy observations. In addition to NASA, the mission involves the US Department of Energy, and government agencies in France, Germany, Italy, Japan, and Sweden.

The James Webb Space Telescope (JWST), launched in December 2021 on an Ariane 5 rocket, operates in a halo orbit circling the Sun-Earth L_{2} point. JWST's high sensitivity in the infrared spectrum and its imaging resolution will allow it to view more distant, faint, or older objects than its predecessors, including Hubble.

==== Earth Sciences Program missions (1965–present) ====
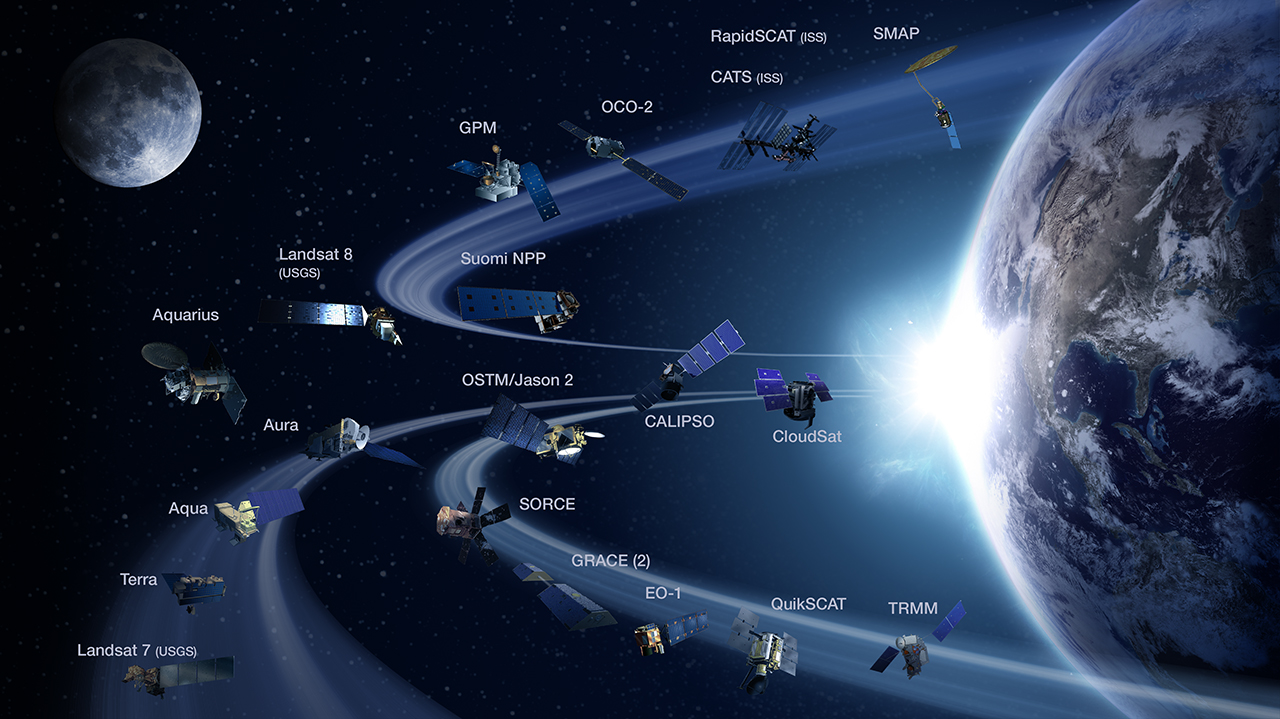
Schematic of NASA Earth Science Division operating satellite missions as of February 2015

NASA Earth Science is a large, umbrella program comprising a range of terrestrial and space-based collection systems in order to better understand the Earth system and its response to natural and human-caused changes. Numerous systems have been developed and fielded over several decades to provide improved prediction for weather, climate, and other changes in the natural environment. Several of the current operating spacecraft programs include: Aqua, Aura, Orbiting Carbon Observatory 2 (OCO-2), Gravity Recovery and Climate Experiment Follow-on (GRACE FO), and Ice, Cloud, and land Elevation Satellite 2 (ICESat-2).

In addition to systems already in orbit, NASA is designing a new set of Earth Observing Systems to study, assess, and generate responses for climate change, natural hazards, forest fires, and real-time agricultural processes. The GOES-T satellite (designated GOES-18 after launch) joined the fleet of US geostationary weather monitoring satellites in March 2022.

NASA also maintains the Earth Science Data Systems (ESDS) program to oversee the life cycle of NASA's Earth science data – from acquisition through processing and distribution. The primary goal of ESDS is to maximize the scientific return from NASA's missions and experiments for research and applied scientists, decision makers, and society at large.

The Earth Science program is managed by the Earth Science Division of the NASA Science Mission Directorate.

=== Space operations architecture ===
NASA invests in various ground and space-based infrastructures to support its science and exploration mandate. The agency maintains access to suborbital and orbital space launch capabilities and sustains ground station solutions to support its evolving fleet of spacecraft and remote systems.

==== Deep Space Network (1963–present) ====
The NASA Deep Space Network (DSN) serves as the primary ground station solution for NASA's interplanetary spacecraft and select Earth-orbiting missions. The system employs ground station complexes near Barstow, California, in Spain near Madrid, and in Australia near Canberra. The placement of these ground stations approximately 120 degrees apart around the planet provides the ability for communications to spacecraft throughout the Solar System even as the Earth rotates about its axis on a daily basis. The system is controlled at a 24x7 operations center at JPL in Pasadena, California, which manages recurring communications linkages with up to 40 spacecraft. The system is managed by the Jet Propulsion Laboratory.

==== Near Space Network (1983–present) ====
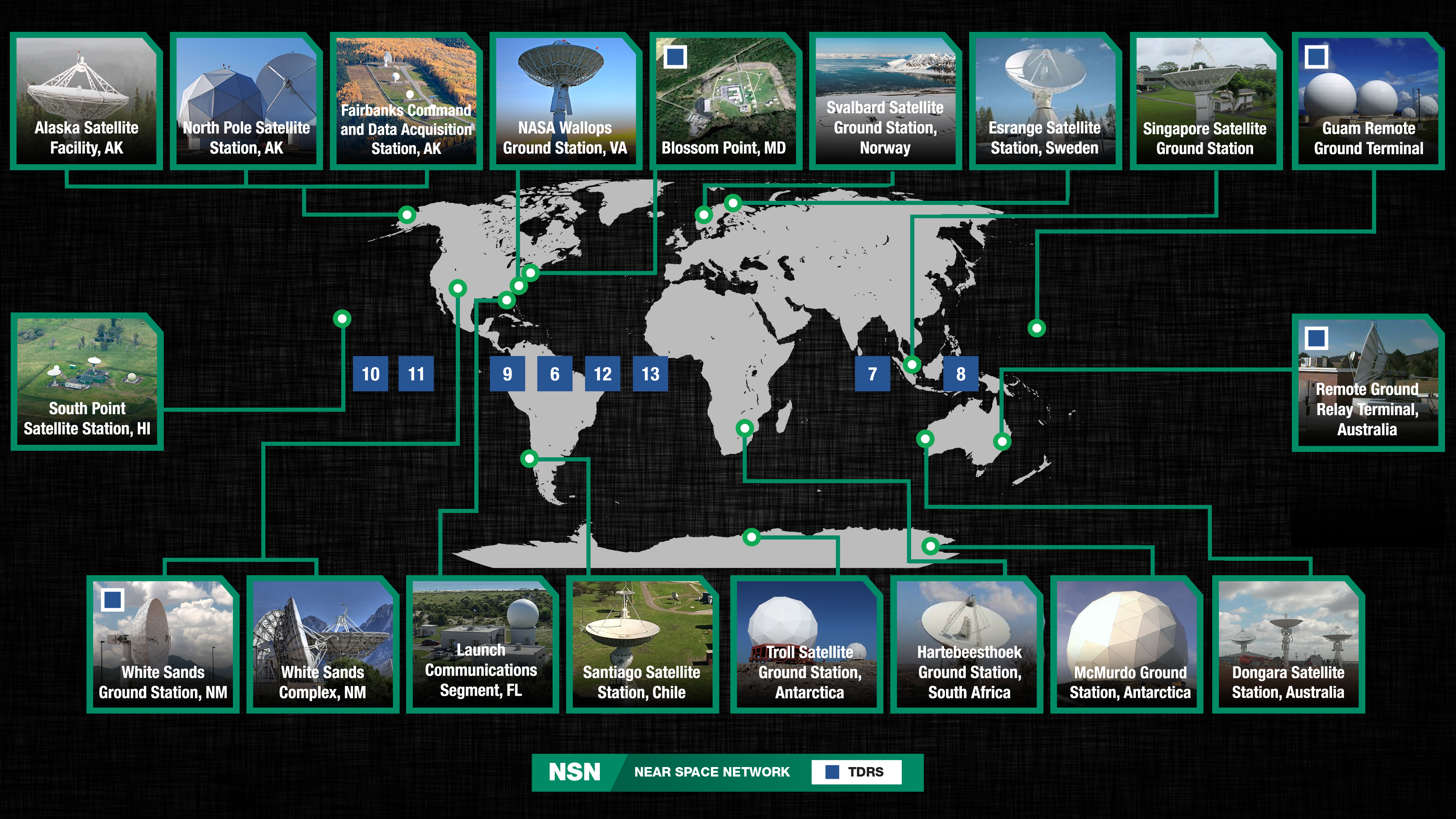
Near Earth Network Ground Stations, 2021

The Near Space Network (NSN) provides telemetry, commanding, ground-based tracking, data and communications services to a wide range of customers with satellites in low earth orbit (LEO), geosynchronous orbit (GEO), highly elliptical orbits (HEO), and lunar orbits. The NSN accumulates ground station and antenna assets from the Near-Earth Network and the Tracking and Data Relay Satellite System (TDRS) which operates in geosynchronous orbit providing continuous real-time coverage for launch vehicles and low earth orbit NASA missions.

The NSN consists of 19 ground stations worldwide operated by the US Government and by contractors including Kongsberg Satellite Services (KSAT), Swedish Space Corporation (SSC), and South African National Space Agency (SANSA). The ground network averages between 120 and 150 spacecraft contacts a day with TDRS engaging with systems on a near-continuous basis as needed; the system is managed and operated by the Goddard Space Flight Center.

==== Sounding Rocket Program (1959–present) ====
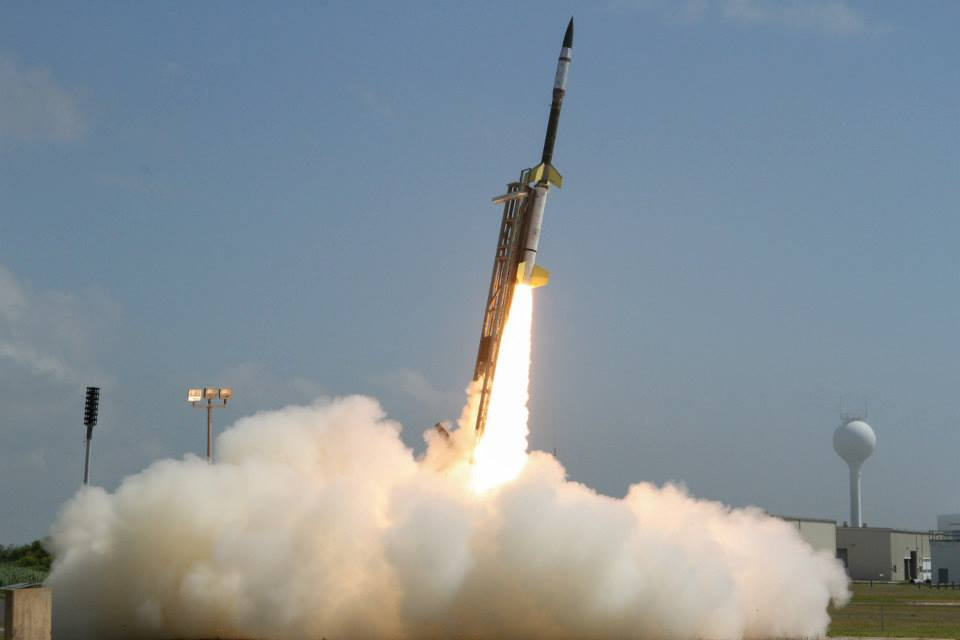
NASA sounding rocket launch from the Wallops Flight Facility

The NASA Sounding Rocket Program (NSRP) is located at the Wallops Flight Facility and provides launch capability, payload development and integration, and field operations support to execute suborbital missions. The program has been in operation since 1959 and is managed by the Goddard Space Flight Center using a combined US Government and contractor team. The NSRP team conducts approximately 20 missions per year from both Wallops and other launch locations worldwide to allow scientists to collect data "where it occurs". The program supports the strategic vision of the Science Mission Directorate collecting important scientific data for earth science, heliophysics, and astrophysics programs.

In June 2022, NASA conducted its first rocket launch from a commercial spaceport outside the US. It launched a Black Brant IX from the Arnhem Space Centre in Australia.

==== Launch Services Program (1990–present) ====

The NASA Launch Services Program (LSP) is responsible for procurement of launch services for NASA uncrewed missions and oversight of launch integration and launch preparation activity, providing added quality and mission assurance to meet program objectives. Since 1990, NASA has purchased expendable launch vehicle launch services directly from commercial providers, whenever possible, for its scientific and applications missions. Expendable launch vehicles can accommodate all types of orbit inclinations and altitudes and are ideal vehicles for launching Earth-orbit and interplanetary missions. LSP operates from Kennedy Space Center and falls under the NASA Space Operations Mission Directorate (SOMD).

=== Aeronautics Research ===
The Aeronautics Research Mission Directorate (ARMD) is one of five mission directorates within NASA, the other four being the Exploration Systems Development Mission Directorate, the Space Operations Mission Directorate, the Science Mission Directorate, and the Space Technology Mission Directorate. The ARMD is responsible for NASA's aeronautical research, which benefits the commercial, military, and general aviation sectors. ARMD performs its aeronautics research at four NASA facilities: Ames Research Center and Armstrong Flight Research Center in California, Glenn Research Center in Ohio, and Langley Research Center in Virginia.

==== NASA X-57 Maxwell aircraft (2016–present) ====
The NASA X-57 Maxwell is an experimental aircraft being developed by NASA to demonstrate the technologies required to deliver a highly efficient all-electric aircraft. The primary goal of the program is to develop and deliver all-electric technology solutions that can also achieve airworthiness certification with regulators. The program involves development of the system in several phases, or modifications, to incrementally grow the capability and operability of the system. The initial configuration of the aircraft has now completed ground testing as it approaches its first flights. In mid-2022, the X-57 was scheduled to fly before the end of the year. The development team includes staff from the NASA Armstrong, Glenn, and Langley centers along with a number of industry partners from the US and Italy.

==== Next Generation Air Transportation System (2007–present) ====
NASA is collaborating with the Federal Aviation Administration and industry stakeholders to modernize the US National Airspace System (NAS). Efforts began in 2007 with a goal to deliver major modernization components by 2025. The modernization effort intends to increase the safety, efficiency, capacity, access, flexibility, predictability, and resilience of the NAS while reducing the environmental impact of aviation. The Aviation Systems Division of NASA Ames operates the joint NASA/FAA North Texas Research Station. The station supports all phases of NextGen research, from concept development to prototype system field evaluation. This facility has already transitioned advanced NextGen concepts and technologies to use through technology transfers to the FAA. NASA contributions also include development of advanced automation concepts and tools that provide air traffic controllers, pilots, and other airspace users with more accurate real-time information about the nation's traffic flow, weather, and routing. Ames' advanced airspace modeling and simulation tools have been used extensively to model the flow of air traffic flow across the US, and to evaluate new concepts in airspace design, traffic flow management, and optimization.

=== Technology research ===
==== Nuclear in-space power and propulsion (ongoing) ====
NASA has made use of technologies such as the multi-mission radioisotope thermoelectric generator (MMRTG), which is a type of radioisotope thermoelectric generator used to power spacecraft. Shortages of the required plutonium-238 have curtailed deep space missions since the turn of the millennium. An example of a spacecraft that was not developed because of a shortage of this material was New Horizons 2.

In July 2021, NASA announced contract awards for development of nuclear thermal propulsion reactors. Three contractors will develop individual designs over 12 months for later evaluation by NASA and the US Department of Energy. NASA's space nuclear technologies portfolio are led and funded by its Space Technology Mission Directorate.

In January 2023, NASA announced a partnership with Defense Advanced Research Projects Agency (DARPA) on the Demonstration Rocket for Agile Cislunar Operations (DRACO) program to demonstrate a NTR engine in space, an enabling capability for NASA missions to Mars. In July 2023, NASA and DARPA jointly announced the award of $499 million to Lockheed Martin to design and build an experimental NTR rocket to be launched in 2027.

In July 2025, Acting NASA Administrator Sean Duffy issued a directive to fast-track plans for placing a nuclear reactor on the Moon to support the agency's Artemis program and maintain U.S. leadership in space exploration. The directive, prompted by concerns that China and Russia may deploy a joint lunar reactor by the mid-2030s, emphasizes the need for a 100-kilowatt system to power long-term lunar missions. Duffy warned that if another nation establishes a reactor first, it could create "keep-out zones" limiting U.S. access.

==== Other initiatives ====
Socioeconomic Data and Applications Center (SEDAC), founded in 1994, "focuses on archiving and distributing data related to human interactions in the environment. SEDAC synthesizes Earth science and socioeconomic data and information" in Palisades, NY, with partner Center for Integrated Earth System Information, Columbia University. SEDAC has extensive geospatial data holdings.

Free Space Optics: NASA contracted a third party to study the probability of using Free Space Optics (FSO) to communicate with Optical (laser) Stations on the Ground (OGS) called laser-com RF networks for satellite communications.

Water Extraction from Lunar Soil. On July 29, 2020, NASA requested American universities to propose new technologies for extracting water from the lunar soil and developing power systems. The idea will help the space agency conduct sustainable exploration of the Moon.

In 2024, NASA was tasked by the US Government to create a Time standard for the Moon. The standard is to be called Coordinated Lunar Time and is expected to be finalized in 2026.

=== Human Spaceflight Research (2005–present) ===
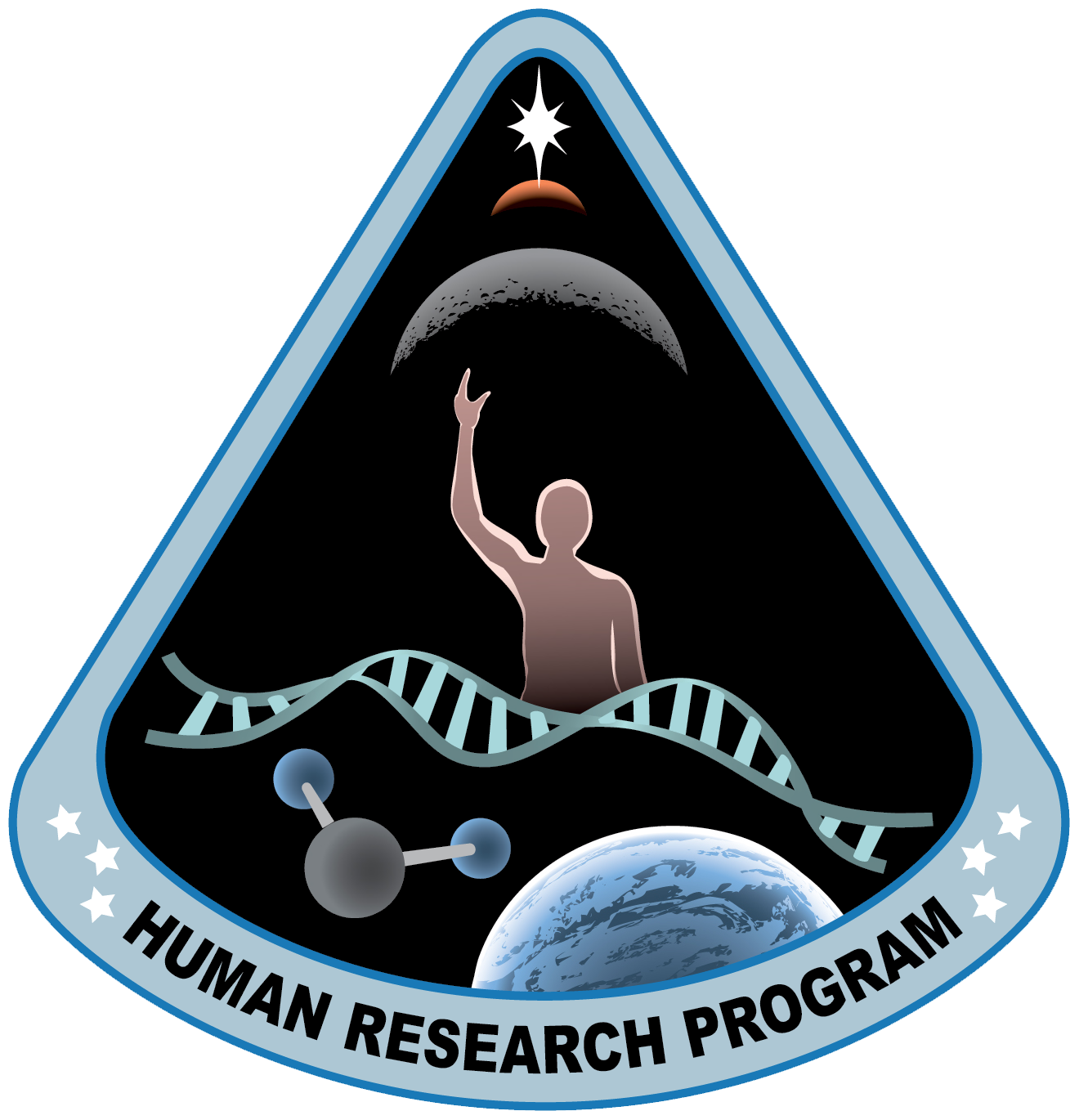

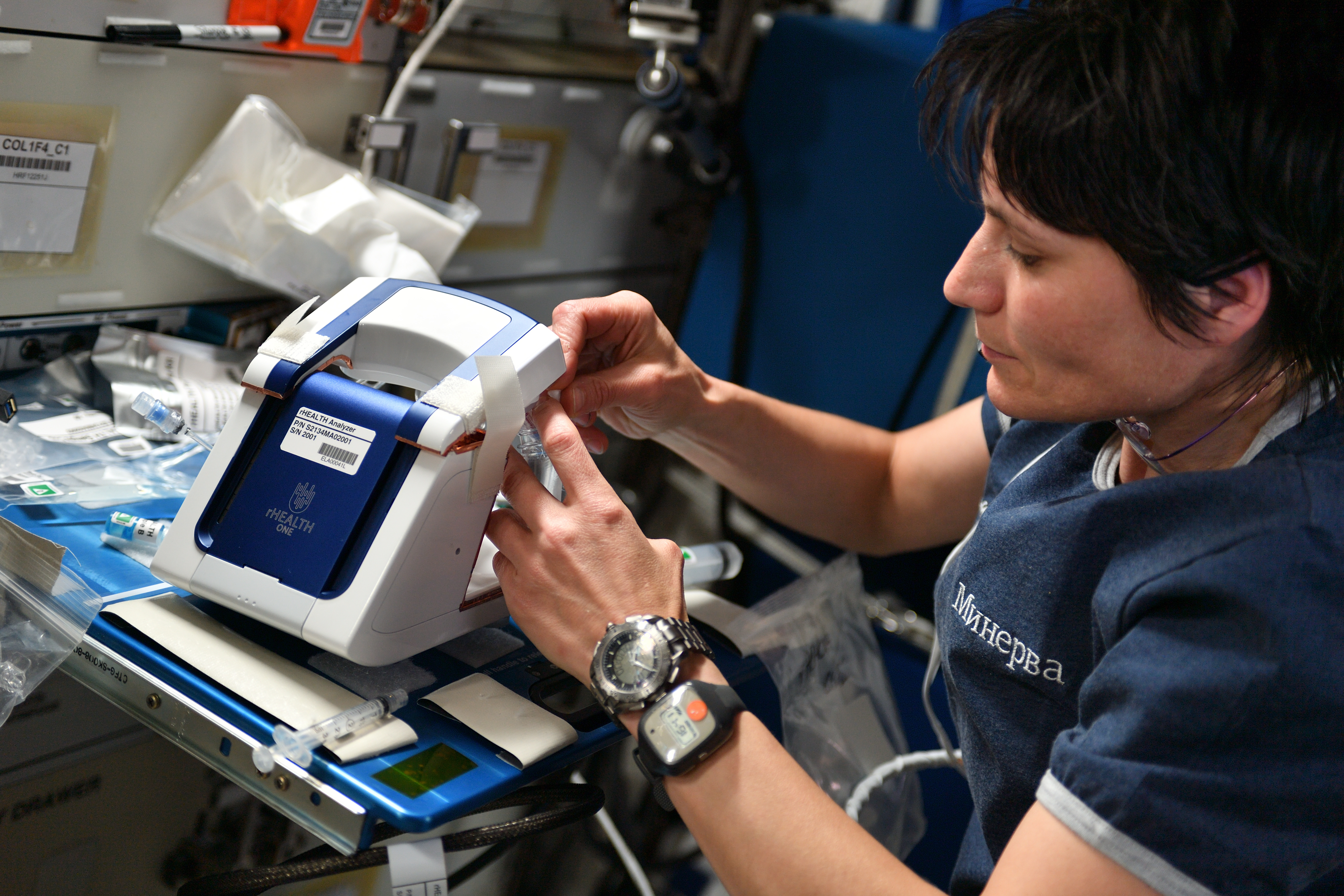
SpaceX Crew-4 astronaut Samantha Cristoforetti operating the rHEALTH ONE on the ISS during a technology demonstration

NASA's Human Research Program (HRP) is designed to study the effects of space on human health and also to provide countermeasures and technologies for human space exploration. The medical effects of space exploration are reasonably limited in low Earth orbit or in travel to the Moon. Travel to Mars is significantly longer and deeper into space, significant medical issues can result. These include bone density loss, radiation exposure, vision changes, circadian rhythm disturbances, heart remodeling, and immune alterations. In order to study and diagnose these ill-effects, HRP has been tasked with identifying or developing small portable instrumentation with low mass, volume, and power to monitor the health of astronauts. As part of the effort to achieve this aim, on May 13, 2022, NASA and SpaceX Crew-4 astronauts successfully tested the rHEALTH ONE, a miniature cytometry-based biomedical analyzer, for its ability to identify and analyze biomarkers, cells, microorganisms, and proteins in a spaceflight environment.

=== Planetary Defense (2016–present) ===
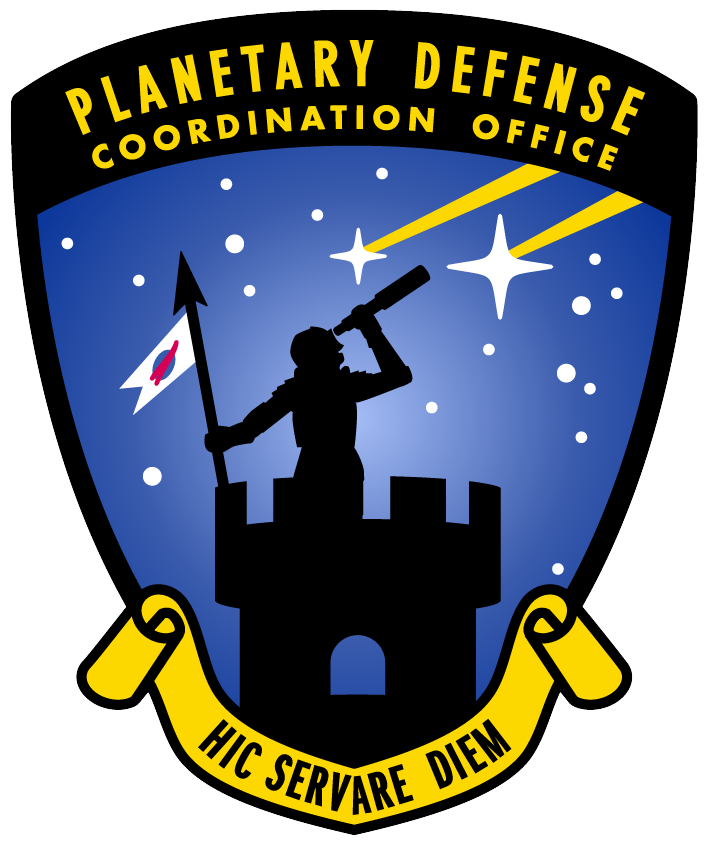

NASA established the Planetary Defense Coordination Office (PDCO) in 2016 to catalog and track potentially hazardous near-Earth objects (NEO), such as asteroids and comets and develop potential responses and defenses against these threats. The PDCO is chartered to provide timely and accurate information to the government and the public on close approaches by Potentially hazardous objects (PHOs) and any potential for impact. The office functions within the Science Mission Directorate Planetary Science Division.

The PDCO augmented prior cooperative actions between the US, the European Union, and other nations which had been scanning the sky for NEOs since 1998 in an effort called Spaceguard.

==== Near Earth object detection (1998–present) ====
From the 1990s NASA has run many NEO detection programs from Earth bases observatories, greatly increasing the number of objects that have been detected. Many asteroids are very dark and those near the Sun are much harder to detect from Earth-based telescopes which observe at night, and thus face away from the Sun. NEOs inside Earth orbit only reflect a part of light also rather than potentially a "full Moon" when they are behind the Earth and fully lit by the Sun.

In 1998, the US Congress gave NASA a mandate to detect 90% of near-Earth asteroids over 1 km (0.62 mi) diameter (that threaten global devastation) by 2008. This initial mandate was met by 2011. In 2005, the original USA Spaceguard mandate was extended by the George E. Brown, Jr. Near-Earth Object Survey Act, which calls for NASA to detect 90% of NEOs with diameters of 140 m (460 ft) or greater, by 2020 (compare to the 20-meter Chelyabinsk meteor that hit Russia in 2013). As of January 2020, it is estimated that less than half of these have been found, but objects of this size hit the Earth only about once in 2,000 years.

In January 2020, NASA officials estimated it would take 30 years to find all objects meeting the 140 m (460 ft) size criteria, more than twice the timeframe that was built into the 2005 mandate. In June 2021, NASA authorized the development of the NEO Surveyor spacecraft to reduce that projected duration to achieve the mandate down to 10 years.

==== Involvement in current robotic missions ====
NASA has incorporated planetary defense objectives into several ongoing missions.

In 1999, NASA visited 433 Eros with the NEAR Shoemaker spacecraft which entered its orbit in 2000, closely imaging the asteroid with various instruments at that time. NEAR Shoemaker became the first spacecraft to successfully orbit and land on an asteroid, improving our understanding of these bodies and demonstrating our capacity to study them in greater detail.

OSIRIS-REx used its suite of instruments to transmit radio tracking signals and capture optical images of Bennu during its study of the asteroid that will help NASA scientists determine its precise position in the solar system and its exact orbital path. As Bennu has the potential for recurring approaches to the Earth-Moon system in the next 100–200 years, the precision gained from OSIRIS-REx will enable scientists to better predict the future gravitational interactions between Bennu and our planet and resultant changes in Bennu's onward flight path.

The WISE/NEOWISE mission was launched by NASA JPL in 2009 as an infrared-wavelength astronomical space telescope. In 2013, NASA repurposed it as the NEOWISE mission to find potentially hazardous near-Earth asteroids and comets; its mission has been extended into 2023.

NASA and Johns Hopkins Applied Physics Laboratory (JHAPL) jointly developed the first planetary defense purpose-built satellite, the Double Asteroid Redirection Test (DART) to test possible planetary defense concepts. DART was launched in November 2021 by a SpaceX Falcon 9 from California on a trajectory designed to impact the Dimorphos asteroid. Scientists were seeking to determine whether an impact could alter the subsequent path of the asteroid; a concept that could be applied to future planetary defense. On September 26, 2022, DART hit its target. In the weeks following impact, NASA declared DART a success, confirming it had shortened Dimorphos' orbital period around Didymos by about 32 minutes, surpassing the pre-defined success threshold of 73 seconds.

NEO Surveyor, formerly called the Near-Earth Object Camera (NEOCam) mission, is a space-based infrared telescope under development to survey the Solar System for potentially hazardous asteroids. The spacecraft is scheduled to launch in 2026.

=== Study of Unidentified Aerial Phenomena (2022–present) ===
In June 2022, the head of the NASA Science Mission Directorate, Thomas Zurbuchen, confirmed the start of NASA's UAP independent study team. At a speech before the National Academies of Science, Engineering and Medicine, Zurbuchen said the space agency would bring a scientific perspective to efforts already underway by the Pentagon and intelligence agencies to make sense of dozens of such sightings. He said it was "high-risk, high-impact" research that the space agency should not shy away from, even if it is a controversial field of study.

== Collaboration ==
=== NASA Advisory Council ===
In response to the Apollo 1 accident, which killed three astronauts in 1967, Congress directed NASA to form an Aerospace Safety Advisory Panel (ASAP) to advise the NASA Administrator on safety issues and hazards in NASA's air and space programs. In the aftermath of the Shuttle Columbia disaster, Congress required that the ASAP submit an annual report to the NASA Administrator and to Congress. By 1971, NASA had also established the Space Program Advisory Council and the Research and Technology Advisory Council to provide the administrator with advisory committee support. In 1977, the latter two were combined to form the NASA Advisory Council (NAC). The NASA Authorization Act of 2014 reaffirmed the importance of ASAP.

=== National Oceanic and Atmospheric Administration (NOAA) ===

NASA and NOAA have cooperated for decades on the development, delivery and operation of polar and geosynchronous weather satellites. The relationship typically involves NASA developing the space systems, launch solutions, and ground control technology for the satellites and NOAA operating the systems and delivering weather forecasting products to users. Multiple generations of NOAA Polar orbiting platforms have operated to provide detailed imaging of weather from low altitude. Geostationary Operational Environmental Satellites (GOES) provide near-real-time coverage of the western hemisphere to ensure accurate and timely understanding of developing weather phenomenon.

=== United States Space Force ===

The United States Space Force (USSF) is the space service branch of the US Armed Forces, while NASA is an independent agency of the US government responsible for civil spaceflight. NASA and the Space Force's predecessors in the Air Force have a long-standing cooperative relationship, with the Space Force supporting NASA launches out of Kennedy Space Center, Cape Canaveral Space Force Station, and Vandenberg Space Force Base, to include range support and rescue operations from Task Force 45. NASA and the Space Force also partner on matters such as defending Earth from asteroids. Space Force members can be NASA astronauts, with Colonel Michael S. Hopkins, the commander of SpaceX Crew-1, commissioned into the Space Force from the International Space Station on December 18, 2020. In September 2020, the Space Force and NASA signed a memorandum of understanding formally acknowledging the joint role of both agencies. This new memorandum replaced a similar document signed in 2006 between NASA and Air Force Space Command.

=== US Geological Survey ===

The Landsat program is the longest-running enterprise for acquisition of satellite imagery of Earth. It is a joint NASA / USGS program. On July 23, 1972, the Earth Resources Technology Satellite was launched. This was eventually renamed to Landsat 1 in 1975. The most recent satellite in the series, Landsat 9, was launched on September 27, 2021.

The instruments on the Landsat satellites have acquired millions of images. The images, archived in the US and at Landsat receiving stations around the world, are a unique resource for global change research and applications in agriculture, cartography, geology, forestry, regional planning, surveillance and education, and can be viewed through the US Geological Survey (USGS) "EarthExplorer" website. The collaboration between NASA and USGS involves NASA designing and delivering the space system (satellite) solution, launching the satellite into orbit with the USGS operating the system once in orbit. As of October 2022, nine satellites have been built with eight of them successfully operating in orbit.

=== European Space Agency (ESA) ===

NASA collaborates with the European Space Agency on a wide range of scientific and exploration requirements. From participation with the Space Shuttle (the Spacelab missions) to major roles on the Artemis program (the Orion Service Module), ESA and NASA have supported the science and exploration missions of each agency. There are NASA payloads on ESA spacecraft and ESA payloads on NASA spacecraft. The agencies have developed joint missions in areas including heliophysics (e.g. Solar Orbiter) and astronomy (Hubble Space Telescope, James Webb Space Telescope).

Under the Artemis Gateway partnership, ESA will contribute habitation and refueling modules, along with enhanced lunar communications, to the Gateway. NASA and ESA continue to advance cooperation in relation to Earth Science including climate change with agreements to cooperate on various missions including the Sentinel-6 series of spacecraft

=== Indian Space Research Organisation (ISRO) ===

In September 2014, NASA and the Indian Space Research Organisation (ISRO) signed a partnership to collaborate on and launch a joint radar mission, the NASA-ISRO Synthetic Aperture Radar (NISAR) mission. The mission was launched on July 30, 2025. NASA has provided the mission's L-band synthetic aperture radar, a high-rate communication subsystem for science data, GPS receivers, a solid-state recorder and payload data subsystem. ISRO has provided the spacecraft bus, the S-band radar, the launch vehicle and associated launch services.

=== Japan Aerospace Exploration Agency (JAXA) ===

NASA and the Japan Aerospace Exploration Agency (JAXA) cooperate on a range of space projects. JAXA is a direct participant in the Artemis program, including the Lunar Gateway effort. JAXA's planned contributions to Gateway include I-Hab's environmental control and life support system, batteries, thermal control, and imagery components, which will be integrated into the module by the European Space Agency (ESA) prior to launch. These capabilities are critical for sustained Gateway operations during crewed and uncrewed time periods.

JAXA and NASA have collaborated on numerous satellite programs, especially in areas of Earth science. NASA has contributed to JAXA satellites and vice versa. Japanese instruments are flying on NASA's Terra and Aqua satellites, and NASA sensors have flown on previous Japanese Earth-observation missions. The NASA-JAXA Global Precipitation Measurement mission was launched in 2014 and includes both NASA- and JAXA-supplied sensors on a NASA satellite launched on a JAXA rocket. The mission provides the frequent, accurate measurements of rainfall over the entire globe for use by scientists and weather forecasters.

=== Roscosmos ===

NASA and Roscosmos have cooperated on the development and operation of the International Space Station since September 1993. The agencies have used launch systems from both countries to deliver station elements to orbit. Astronauts and Cosmonauts jointly maintain various elements of the station. Both countries provide access to the station via launch systems noting Russia's unique role as the sole provider of delivery of crew and cargo upon retirement of the space shuttle in 2011 and prior to commencement of NASA COTS and crew flights. In July 2022, NASA and Roscosmos signed a deal to share space station flights enabling crew from each country to ride on the systems provided by the other. Current geopolitical conditions in late 2022 make it unlikely that cooperation will be extended to other programs such as Artemis or lunar exploration.

=== Artemis Accords ===
The Artemis Accords have been established to define a framework for cooperating in the peaceful exploration and exploitation of the Moon, Mars, asteroids, and comets. The accords were drafted by NASA and the US State Department and are executed as a series of bilateral agreements between the US and the participating countries. As of June 2023, 22 countries have signed the accords. They are Australia, Bahrain, Brazil, Canada, Colombia, France, India, Israel, Italy, Japan, the Republic of Korea, Luxembourg, Mexico, New Zealand, Poland, Romania, the Kingdom of Saudi Arabia, Singapore, Ukraine, the United Arab Emirates, the UK, and the US.

=== China National Space Administration ===
The Wolf Amendment was passed by the US Congress into law in 2011 and prevents NASA from engaging in direct, bilateral cooperation with the Chinese government and China-affiliated organizations such as the China National Space Administration without the explicit authorization from Congress and the Federal Bureau of Investigation. The law has been renewed annually since by inclusion in annual appropriations bills.

=== United Kingdom Space Agency ===

The UKSA and NASA have cooperated with each other on many levels. During the Ariel Programme which saw the creation and launch of the UK's first satellites, multiple Ariel satellites were launched by NASA. This continued with NASA launching many of the United Kingdom's satellites as well as sharing scientific data and cooperating with each other on various different scientific projects. On September 22 2021 NASA and the UKSA signed an agreement which entailed that a magnetometer on the Interstellar Mapping and Acceleration Probe would be designed by Imperial College London. The United Kingdom signed the Artemis Accords on October 13 2020, with one of the major roles of the United Kingdom being the design of the habitation module and surface module of the Lunar Gateway.

=== Israel Space Agency ===
The ISA and NASA cooperate with each other on scientific endeavours frequently. Multiple ISA experiments in space were done via the Shuttle program, including the Israeli Space Agency Investigation About Hornets also known as the Hornet Experiment in 1992 and the MEIDEX Freestar Experiment in 2003. Israel's first astronaut, Ilan Ramon, was aboard the STS-107 mission on Space Shuttle Columbia. Israel signed the Artemis Accords on January 26 2022.

== Management ==
=== Leadership ===
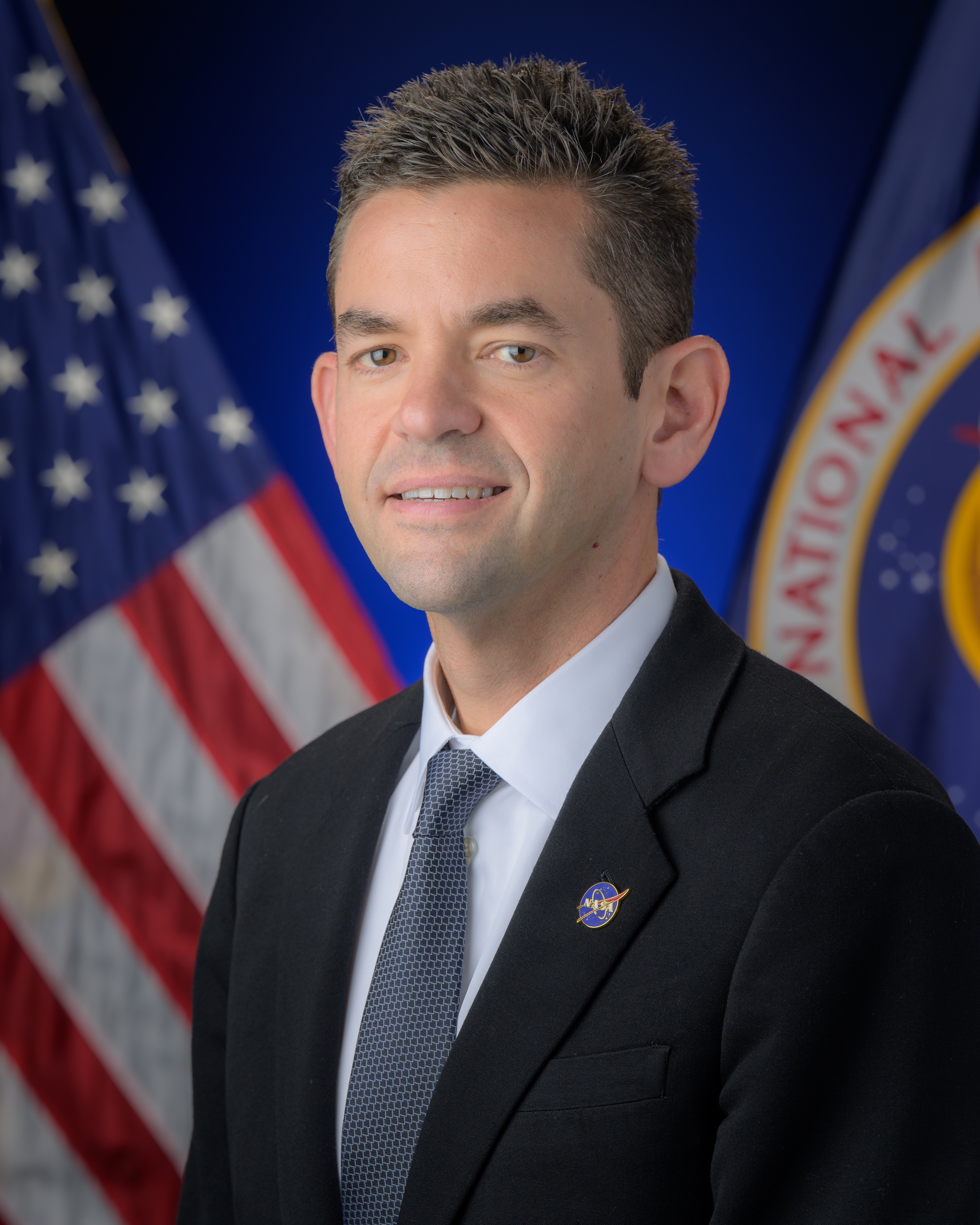
Administrator Jared Isaacman (2025–present)

The agency's administration is located at NASA Headquarters in Washington, DC, and provides overall guidance and direction. Except under exceptional circumstances, NASA civil service employees are required to be US citizens. NASA's administrator is nominated by the US president subject to Senate approval and serves at the president's pleasure as a senior space science advisor.

Jared Isaacman is the administrator of NASA since December 2025. His first nomination was withdrawn by President Donald Trump on May 31, 2025. He was renominated on November 4, 2025, and confirmed by the Senate on December 17.

=== Strategic plan ===
NASA operates with four FY2022 strategic goals.

- Expand human knowledge through new scientific discoveries
- Extend human presence to the Moon and on towards Mars for sustainable long-term exploration, development, and utilization
- Catalyze economic growth and drive innovation to address national challenges
- Enhance capabilities and operations to catalyze current and future mission success

=== Budget ===
NASA budget requests are developed by NASA and approved by the administration prior to submission to the US Congress. Authorized budgets are those that have been included in enacted appropriations bills that are approved by both houses of Congress and enacted into law by the US president.

NASA fiscal year budget requests and authorized budgets are listed below.

Year	Budget Request in bil. US$	Authorized Budget in bil. US$	US Government Employees
2018	$19.092	$20.736	17,551
2019	$19.892	$21.500	17,551
2020	$22.613	$22.629	18,048
2021	$25.246	$23.271	18,339
2022	$24.802	$24.041	18,400 est

=== Organization ===
Budget allocations to Mission Directorates
1. Human Spaceflight (45.0%)
2. Science (32.0%)
3. Mission Support (14.0%)
4. Research & Technology (9.00%)

NASA funding and priorities are developed through its four Mission Directorates.

Mission Directorate	Associate Administrator	% of Budget
Human Spaceflight (HSMD)	Lori Glaze	45%
Mission Support (MSMD)	John Bailey	14%
Research and Technology (RTMD)	James Kenyon	9%
Science (SMD)	Nicola Fox	32%

NASA field centers

NASA operates ten field centers which manage and execute the agency's programs and activities. Under a management structure announced in May 2026, each field center receives a basic level of funding for its operations, and can "compete" for additional funding from the mission directorates.

Field Center	Primary Location	Director
Ames Research Center	Moffett Field, California	Eugene Tu
Armstrong Flight Research Center	Edwards, California	Troy Asher
Glenn Research Center	Cleveland, Ohio	Dawn Schaible
Goddard Space Flight Center	Greenbelt, Maryland	Jamie Dunn
Jet Propulsion Laboratory	La Cañada Flintridge, California	Dave Gallagher
Johnson Space Center	Houston, Texas	Vanessa Wyche
Kennedy Space Center	Merritt Island, Florida	Brian Hughes
Langley Research Center	Hampton, Virginia	Trina Dyal (acting)
Marshall Space Flight Center	Huntsville, Alabama	Stephen Cash
Stennis Space Center	Hancock County, Mississippi	Christine Powell

== Sustainability ==
=== Environmental impact ===
The exhaust gases produced by rocket propulsion systems, both in Earth's atmosphere and in space, can adversely affect the Earth's environment. Some hypergolic rocket propellants, such as hydrazine, are highly toxic prior to combustion, but decompose into less toxic compounds after burning. Rockets using hydrocarbon fuels, such as kerosene, release carbon dioxide and soot in their exhaust. Carbon dioxide emissions are insignificant compared to those from other sources; on average, the US consumed 803 million US gal (3.0 million m^{3}) of liquid fuels per day in 2014, while a single Falcon 9 rocket first stage burns around 25,000 US gallons (95 m^{3}) of kerosene fuel per launch. Even if a Falcon 9 were launched every single day, it would only represent 0.006% of liquid fuel consumption (and carbon dioxide emissions) for that day. Additionally, the exhaust from LOx- and LH2-fueled engines, like the SSME, is almost entirely water vapor. NASA addressed environmental concerns with its canceled Constellation program in accordance with the National Environmental Policy Act in 2011. In contrast, ion engines use harmless noble gases like xenon for propulsion.

An example of NASA's environmental efforts is the NASA Sustainability Base. Additionally, the Exploration Sciences Building was awarded the LEED Gold rating in 2010. On May 8, 2003, the Environmental Protection Agency recognized NASA as the first federal agency to directly use landfill gas to produce energy at one of its facilities—the Goddard Space Flight Center, Greenbelt, Maryland.

In 2018, NASA along with other companies including Sensor Coating Systems, Pratt & Whitney, Monitor Coating and UTRC launched the project CAUTION (CoAtings for Ultra High Temperature detectION). This project aims to enhance the temperature range of the Thermal History Coating up to 1,500 °C (2,730 °F) and beyond. The final goal of this project is improving the safety of jet engines as well as increasing efficiency and reducing CO_{2} emissions.

=== Climate change ===
NASA also researches and publishes on climate change. Its statements concur with the global scientific consensus that the climate is warming. Bob Walker, who has advised former US President Donald Trump on space issues, has advocated that NASA should focus on space exploration and that its climate study operations should be transferred to other agencies such as NOAA. Former NASA atmospheric scientist J. Marshall Shepherd countered that Earth science study was built into NASA's mission at its creation in the 1958 National Aeronautics and Space Act. NASA won the 2020 Webby People's Voice Award for Green in the category Web.

=== STEM Initiatives ===
Educational Launch of Nanosatellites (ELaNa). Since 2011, the ELaNa program has provided opportunities for NASA to work with university teams to test emerging technologies and commercial-off-the-shelf solutions by providing launch opportunities for developed CubeSats using NASA procured launch opportunities. By example, two NASA-sponsored CubeSats launched in June 2022 on a Virgin Orbit LauncherOne vehicle as the ELaNa 39 mission.

Cubes in Space. NASA started an annual competition in 2014 named "Cubes in Space". It is jointly organized by NASA and the global education company I Doodle Learning, with the objective of teaching school students aged 11–18 to design and build scientific experiments to be launched into space on a NASA rocket or balloon. On June 21, 2017, the world's smallest satellite, KalamSAT, was launched.

=== Use of the metric system ===
US law requires the International System of Units to be used in all US Government programs, "except where impractical".

In 1969, Apollo 11 landed on the Moon using a mix of US customary units and metric units. In the 1980s, NASA started the transition towards the metric system, but was still using both systems in the 1990s. On September 23, 1999, a mixup between NASA's use of SI units and Lockheed Martin Space's use of US units resulted in the loss of the Mars Climate Orbiter.

In August 2007, NASA stated that all future missions and explorations of the Moon would be done entirely using the SI system. This was done to improve cooperation with space agencies of other countries that already use the metric system. As of 2007, NASA is predominantly working with SI units, but some projects still use US units, and some, including the International Space Station, use a mix of both.

== Media presence ==
=== NASA TV ===
NASA TV (originally NASA Select) was the television service of the National Aeronautics and Space Administration (NASA). It was broadcast by satellite with a simulcast over the Internet. Local cable television providers across the United States and amateur television repeaters carried NASA TV at their own discretion, as NASA-created content is considered a work of the U.S. government and is within the public domain. NASA TV was also available via various cable, satellite, and over-the-top media services worldwide. The network was formally created in the early 1980s to provide NASA managers and engineers with real-time video of missions. NASA has operated a television service since the beginning of the space program for archival purposes, and to provide media outlets with video footage.

The network aired a large amount of educational programming and provided live coverage of an array of crewed missions (including the International Space Station), robotic missions, and domestic and international launches. The network completed its conversion from analog to digital transmission in late 2005 following the launch of STS-114, ending a period of dual analog and digital broadcasting. However, some cable television systems may still have transmitted in analog before the U.S. digital television transition. The satellite link used the DVB-S system for transmission.

On July 29, 2024, NASA announced that it would phase out NASA TV in favor of NASA+ due to an increase of viewership on its digital platforms. The linear feeds closed on August 28 of that year, at 11 PM Eastern Daylight Time.

=== NASAcast ===
NASAcast is the official audio and video podcast of the NASA website. Created in late 2005, the podcast service contains the latest audio and video features from the NASA web site, including NASA TV's This Week at NASA and educational materials produced by NASA. Additional NASA podcasts, such as Science@NASA, are also featured and give subscribers an in-depth look at content by subject matter.

=== NASA EDGE ===
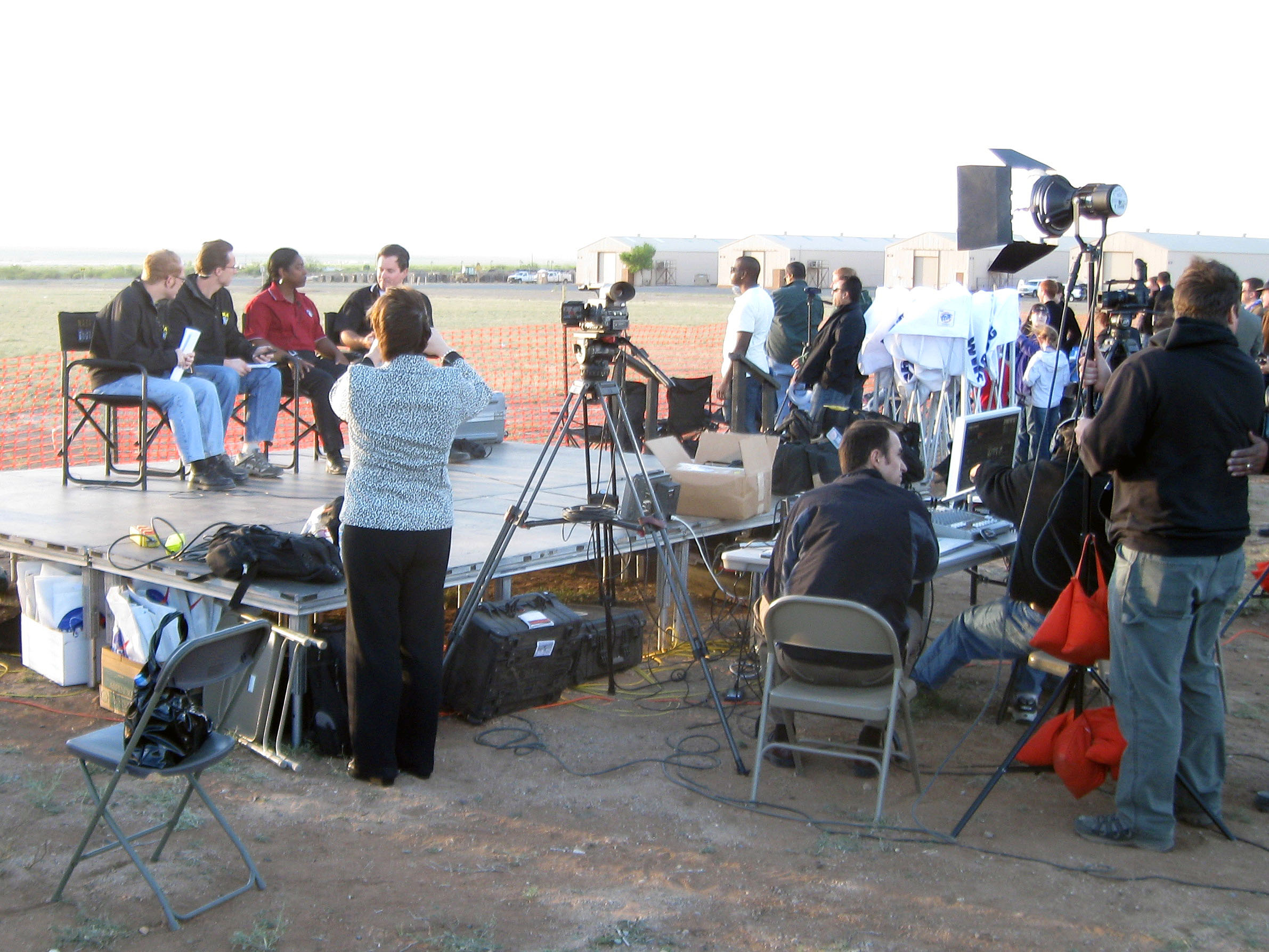
NASA EDGE broadcasting live from White Sands Missile Range in 2010

NASA EDGE is a video podcast which explores different missions, technologies and projects developed by NASA. The program was released by NASA on March 18, 2007, and, as of August 2020, there have been 200 vodcasts produced. It is a public outreach vodcast sponsored by NASA's Exploration Systems Mission Directorate and based out of the Exploration and Space Operations Directorate at Langley Research Center in Hampton, Virginia. The NASA EDGE team takes an insider's look at current projects and technologies from NASA facilities around the US, and it is depicted through personal interviews, on-scene broadcasts, computer animations, and personal interviews with top scientists and engineers at NASA. (Note: NASA EDGE Cast and Crew: Chris Giersch (Host); Blair Allen (Co-host and senior producer); Franklin Fitzgerald (News anchor and "everyman"); Jaqueline Mirielle Cortez (Special co-host); Ron Beard (Director and "set therapist"); and Don Morrison (Audio/video engineer))

The show explores the contributions NASA has made to society as well as the progress of current projects in materials and space exploration. NASA EDGE vodcasts can be downloaded from the NASA website and from iTunes.

In its first year of production, the show was downloaded over 450,000 times. As of February 2010, the average download rate is more than 420,000 per month, with over one million downloads in December 2009 and January 2010.

NASA and the NASA EDGE have also developed interactive programs designed to complement the vodcast. The Lunar Electric Rover App allows users to drive a simulated Lunar Electric Rover between objectives, and it provides information about and images of the vehicle. The NASA EDGE Widget provides a graphical user interface for accessing NASA EDGE vodcasts, image galleries, and the program's Twitter feed, as well as a live NASA news feed.

=== Astronomy Picture of the Day ===
Astronomy Picture of the Day (APOD) is a website provided by NASA and Michigan Technological University (MTU). Each day it features a different image of the universe accompanied by an explanation written by a professional astronomer. The photograph does not necessarily correspond to a celestial event on the exact day that it is displayed, and images are sometimes repeated. These often relate to current events in astronomy and space exploration. The text has several hyperlinks to more pictures and websites for more information. The images are either visible spectrum photographs, images taken at non-visible wavelengths and displayed in false color, video footage, animations, artist's conceptions, or micrographs that relate to space or cosmology.

Past images are stored in the APOD Archive, with the first image appearing on June 16, 1995. This initiative has received support from NASA, the National Science Foundation, and MTU. The images are sometimes authored by people or organizations outside NASA, and therefore APOD images are often copyrighted, unlike many other NASA image galleries.

=== NASA+ ===
In July 2023, NASA announced a new streaming service known as NASA+. It launched on November 8, 2023, and has live coverage of launches, documentaries and original programs. According to NASA, it will be free of ads and subscription fees. It will be a part of the NASA app on iOS, Android, Amazon Fire TV, Roku and Apple TV as well as on the web on desktop and mobile devices.

== Gallery ==
=== NASA spacecraft observations of the Solar System ===
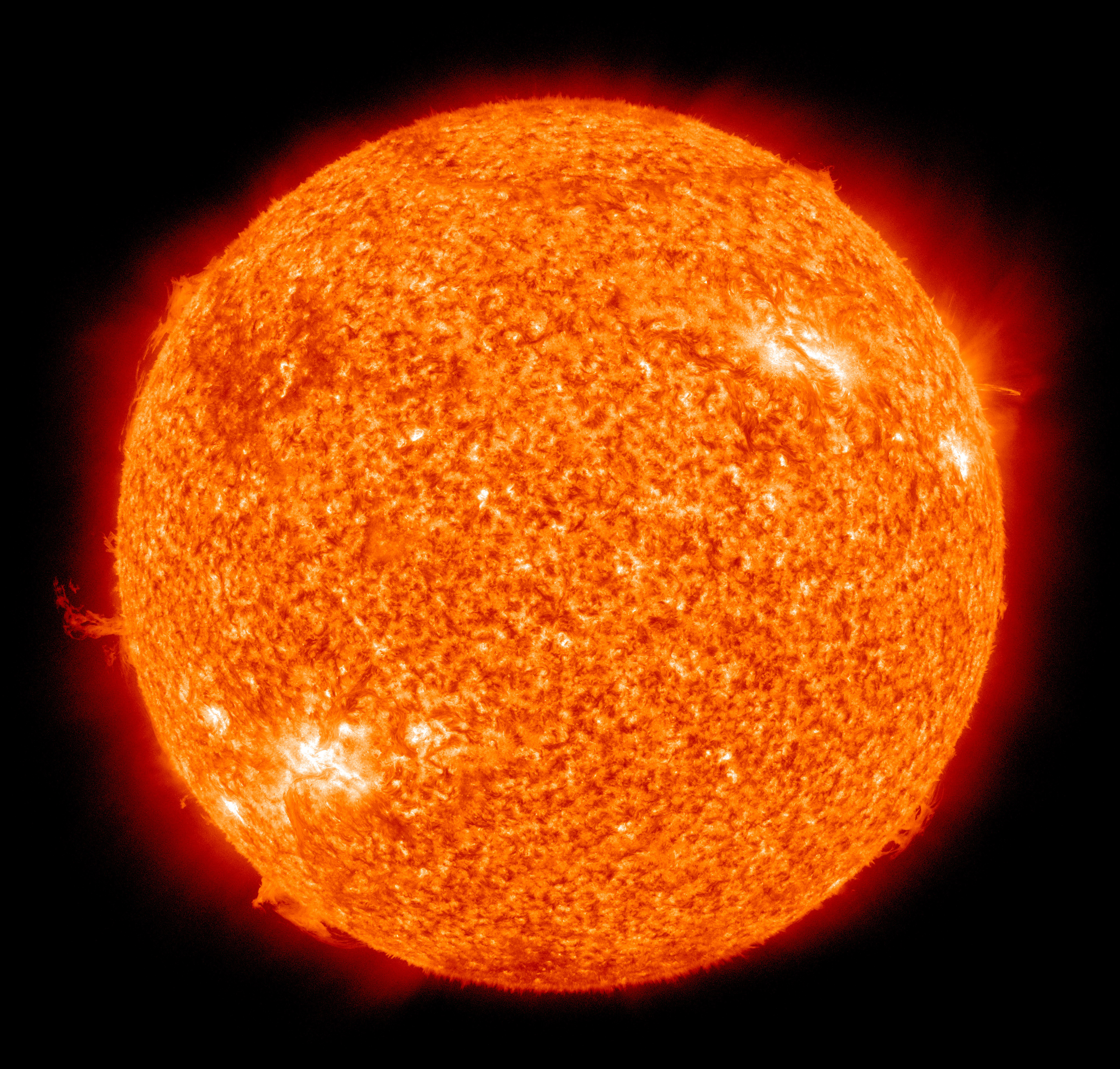
Sun image by Solar Dynamics Observatory, 2010

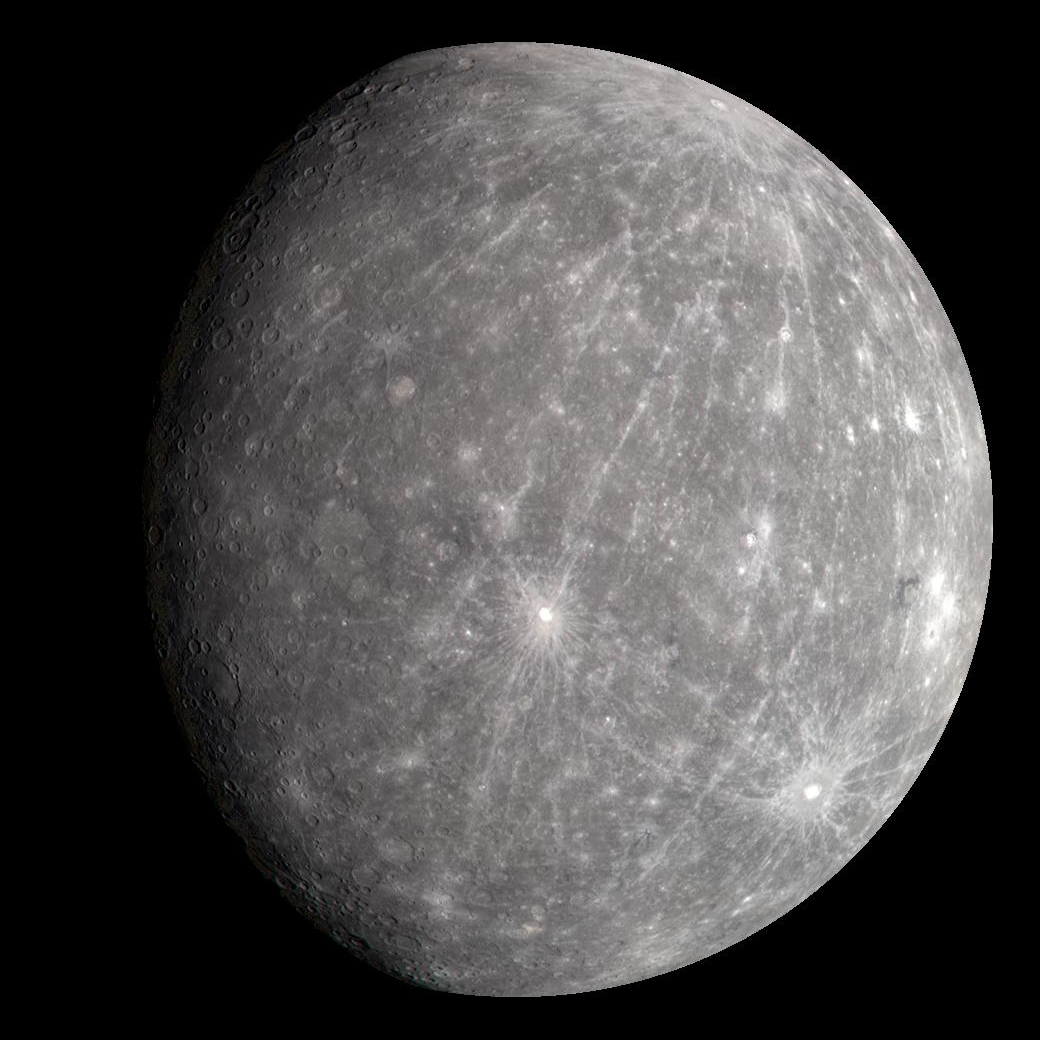
Planet Mercury image by MESSENGER, 2008

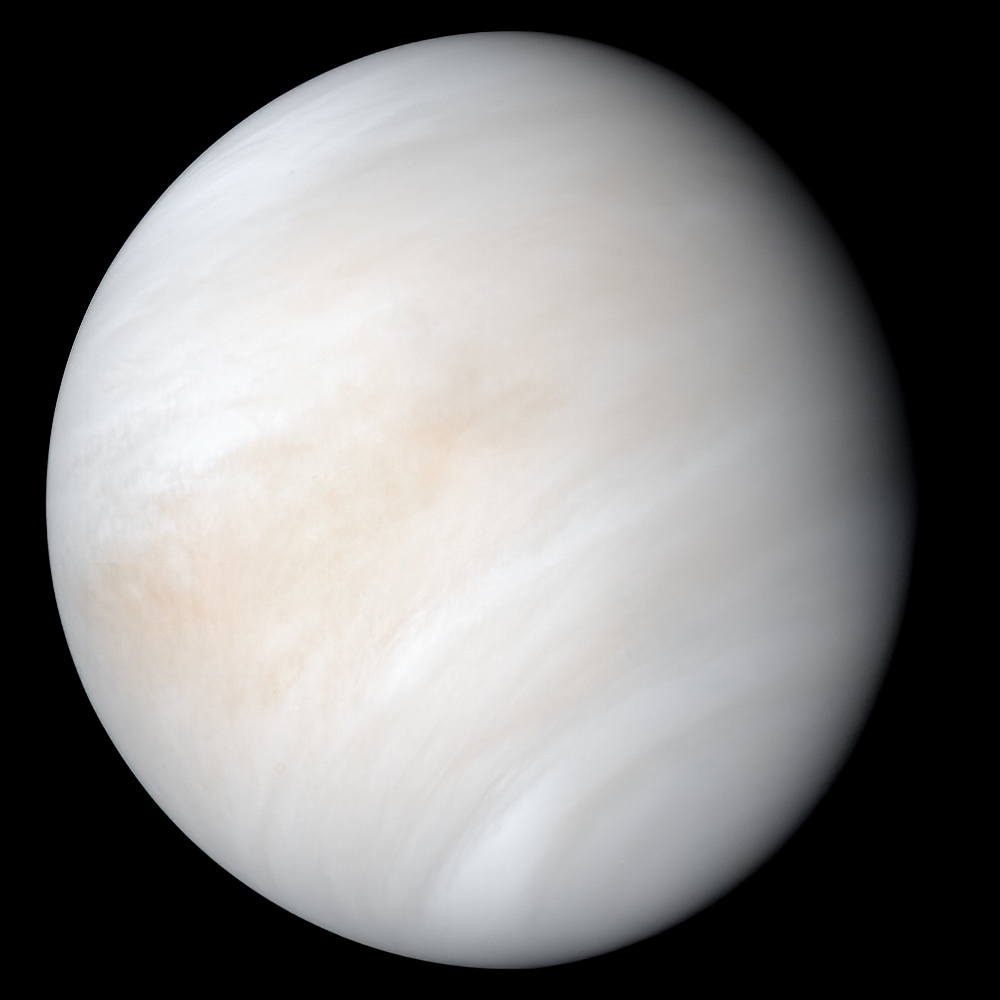
Planet Venus image by Mariner 10, 1974

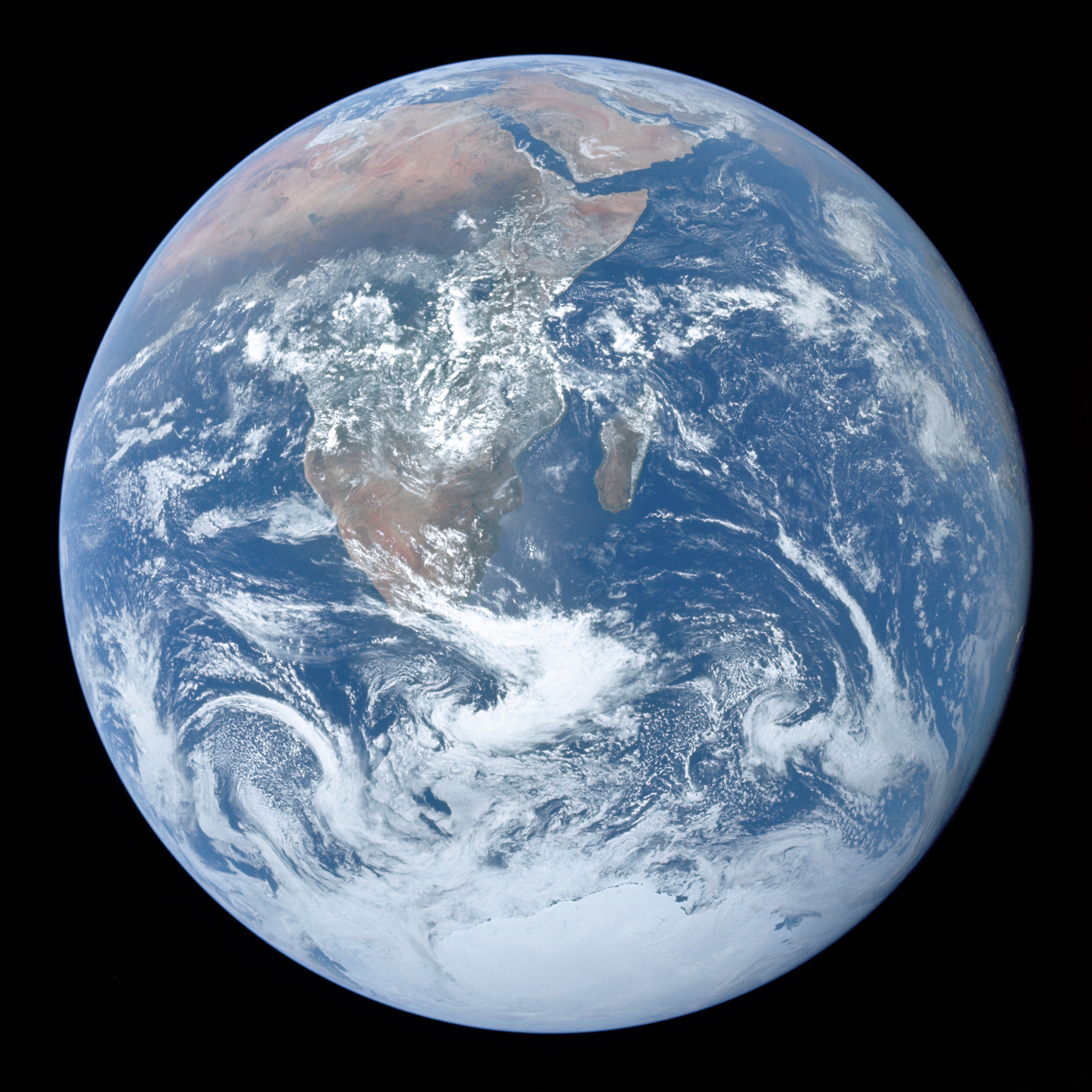
Planet Earth image by Apollo 17 crew, 1972

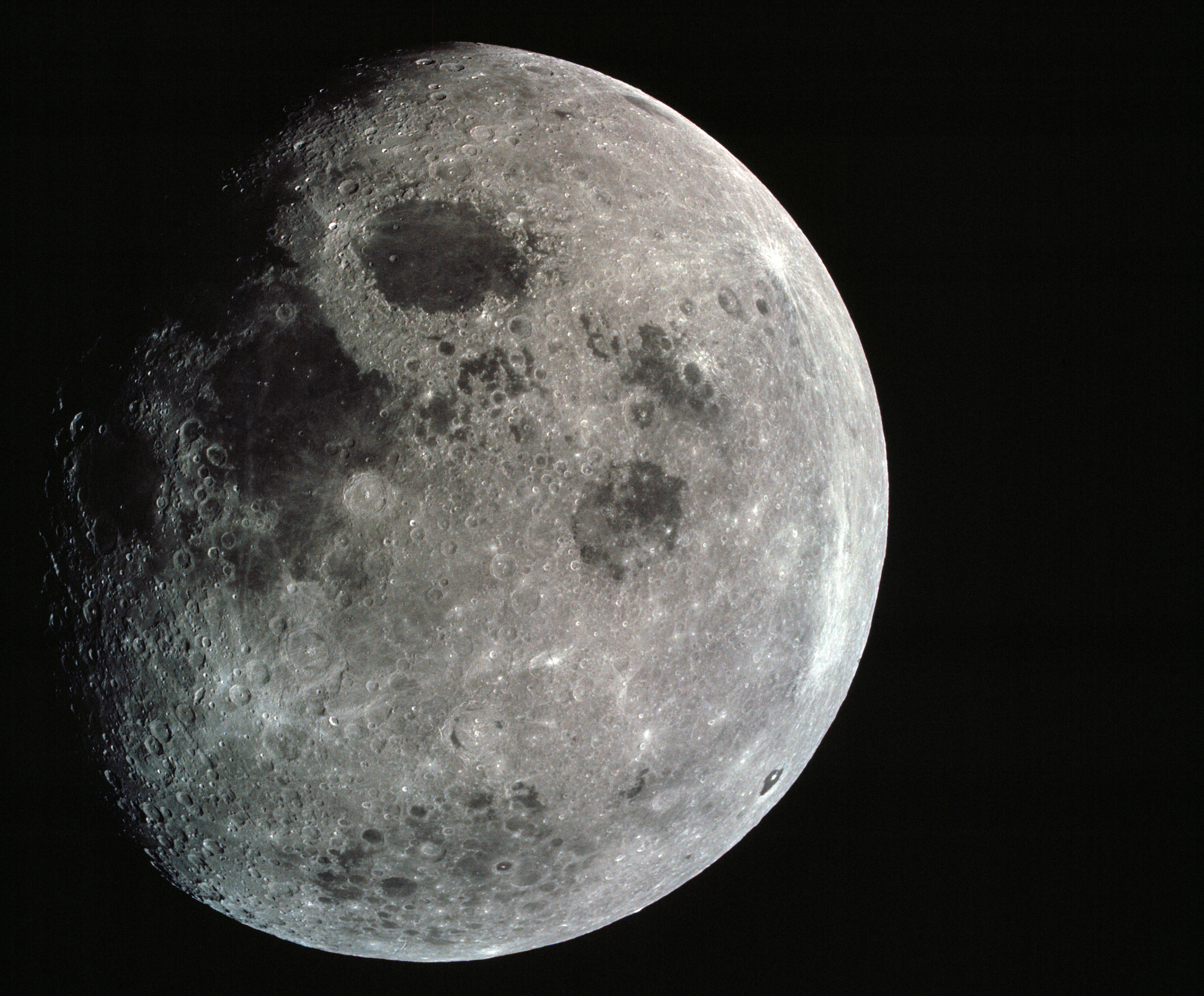
Moon image by Apollo 8 crew, 1968

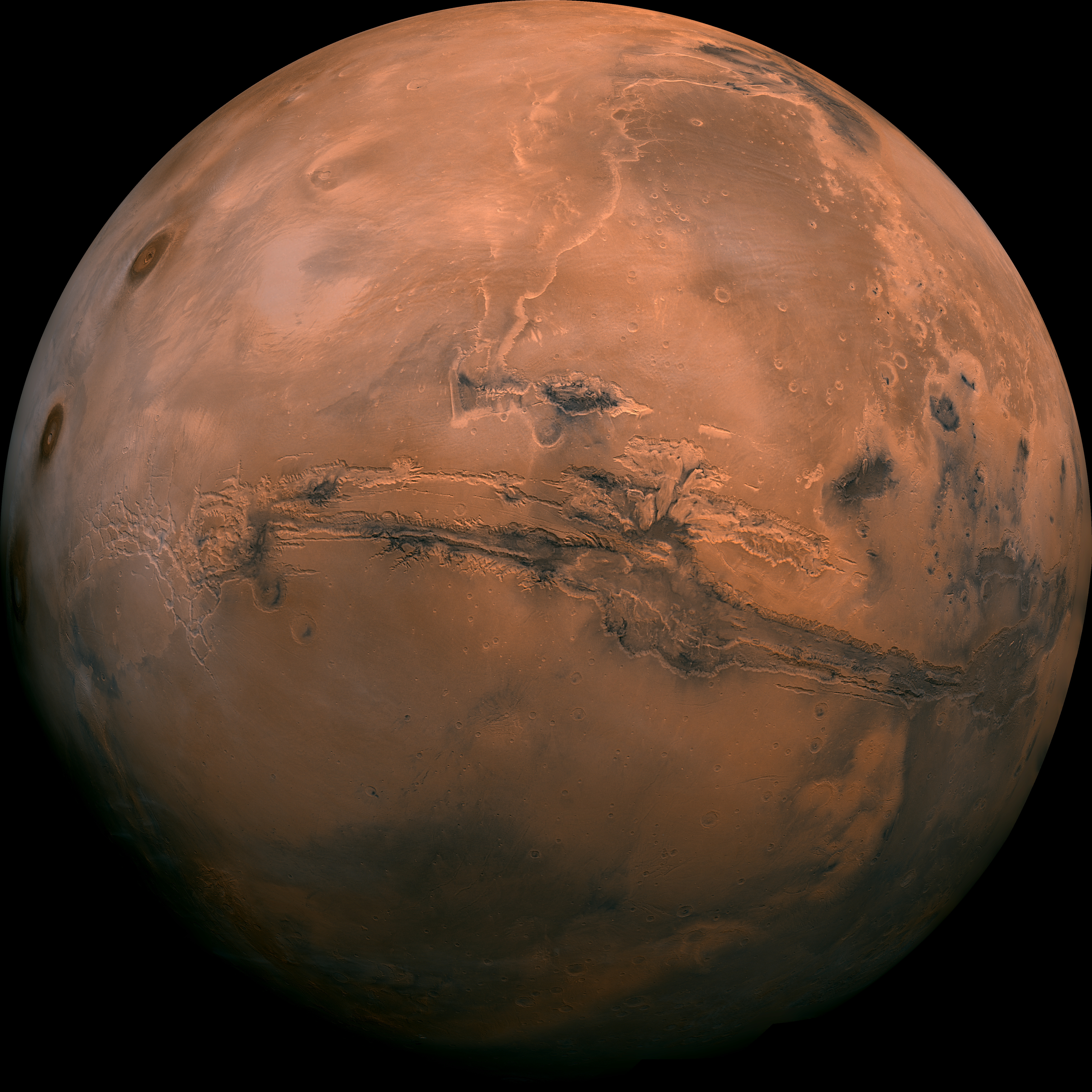
Planet Mars image by Viking 1, 1976

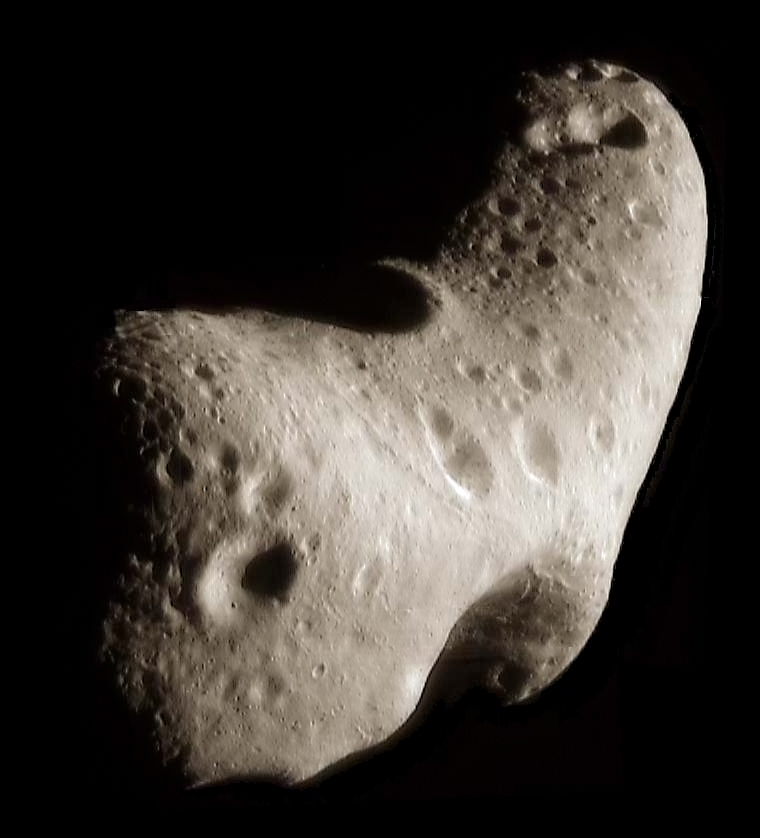
Asteroid 433 Eros image by NEAR Shoemaker, 2000

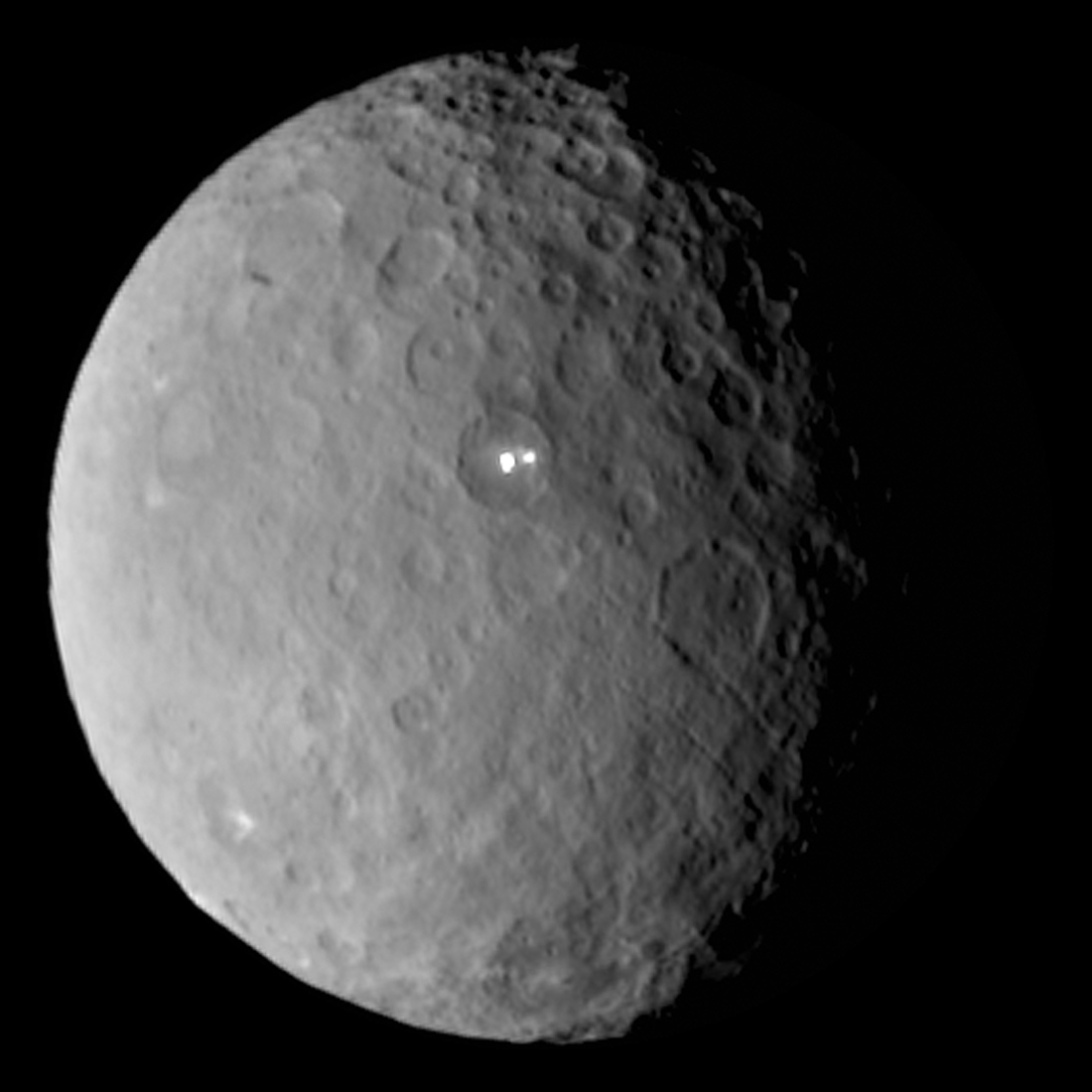
Dwarf planet Ceres image by Dawn, 2015

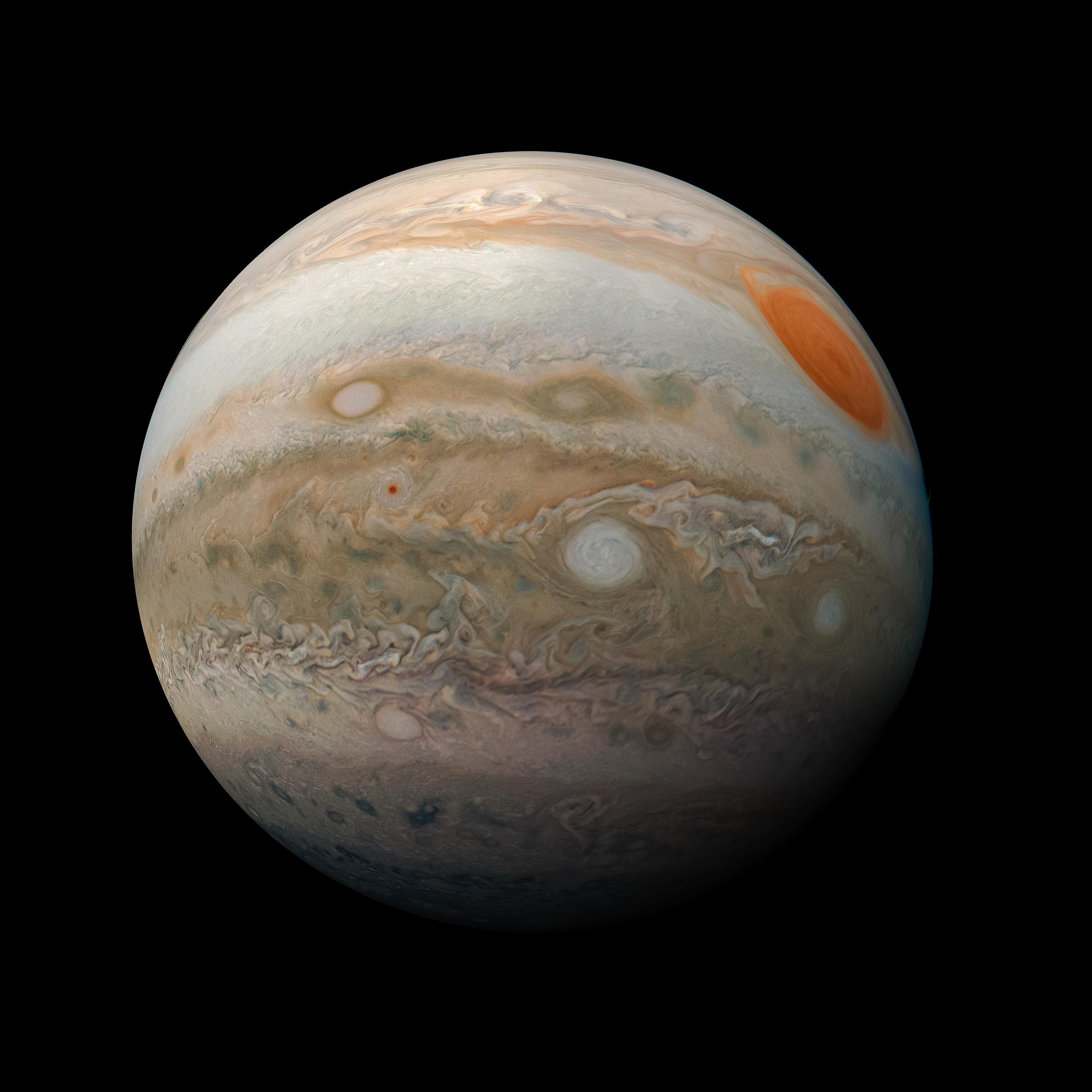
Planet Jupiter image by Juno, 2019

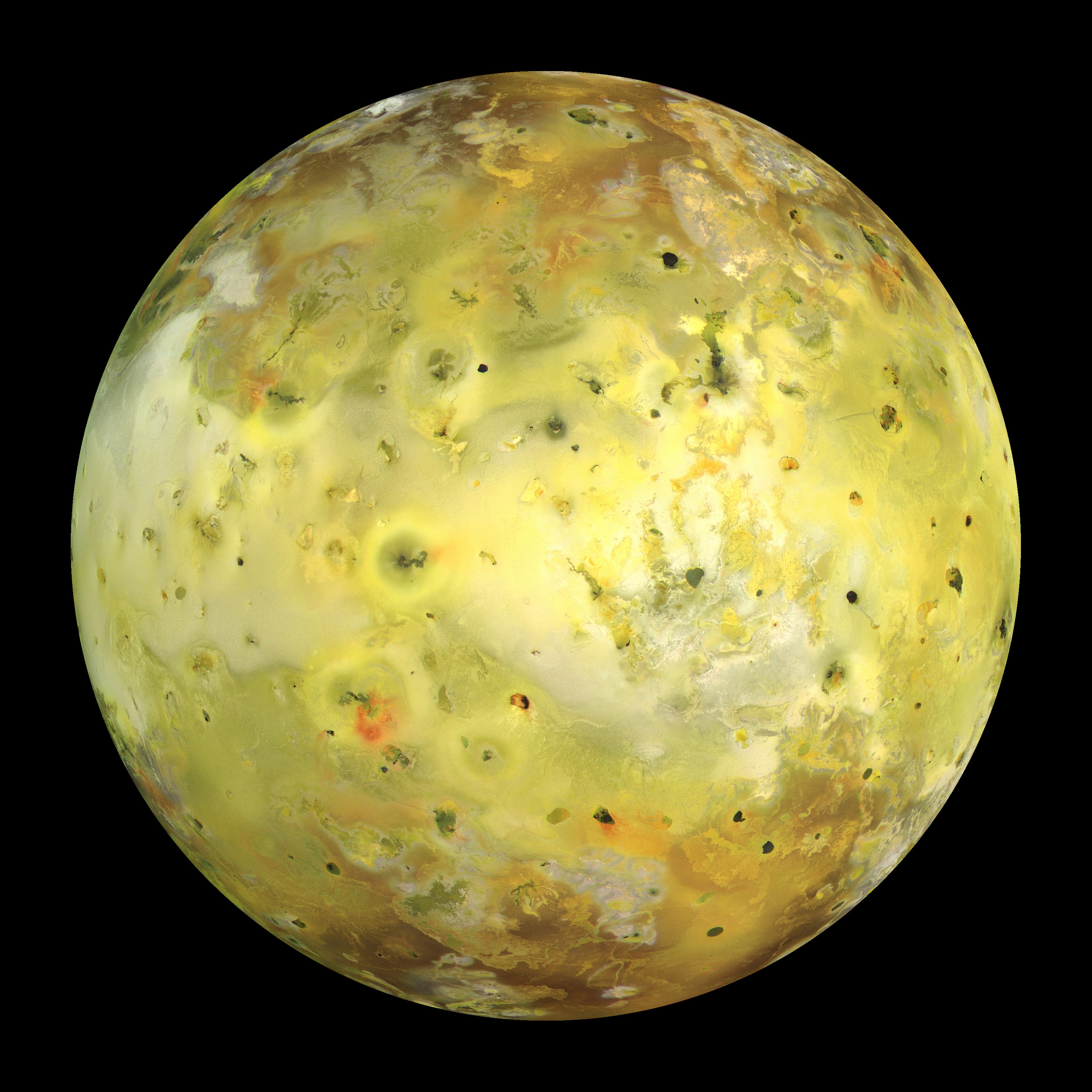
Moon Io (Jupiter) image by Galileo, 1999

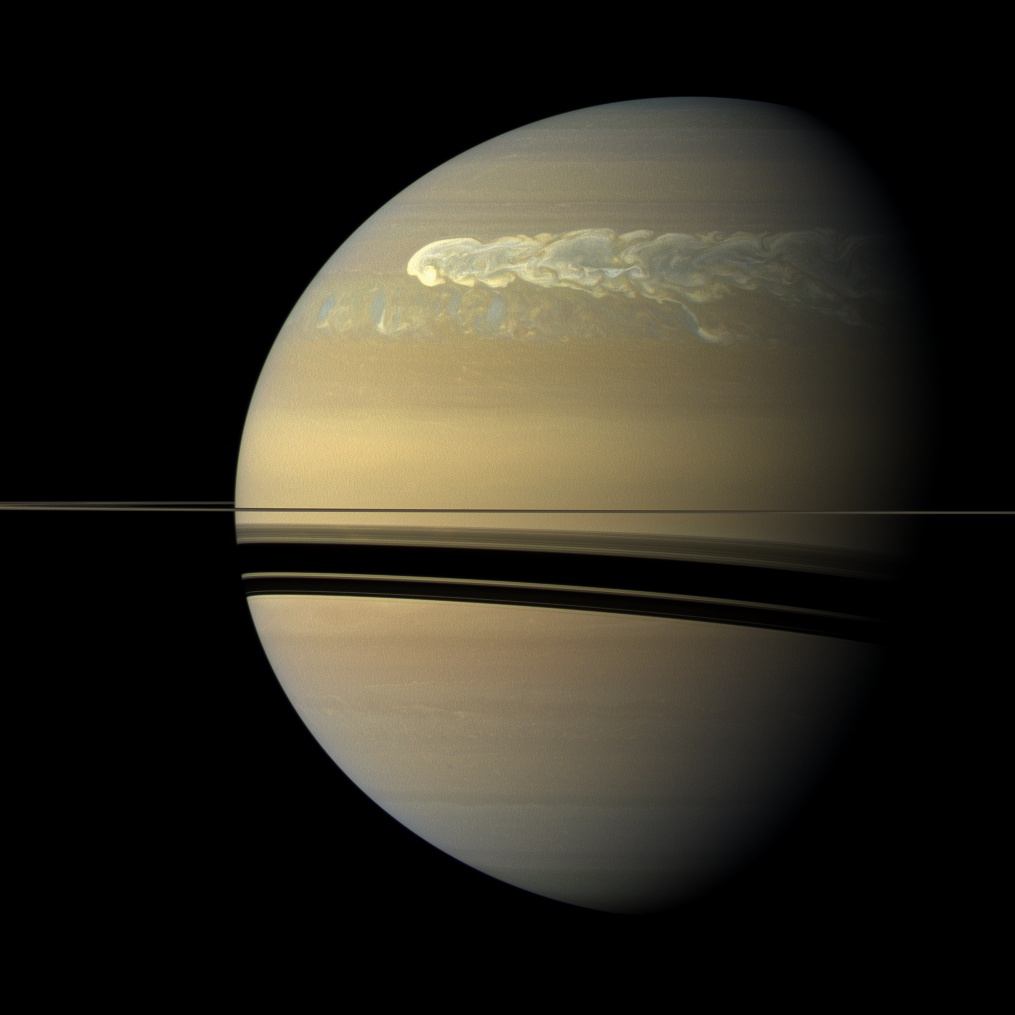
Planet Saturn image by Cassini, 2016

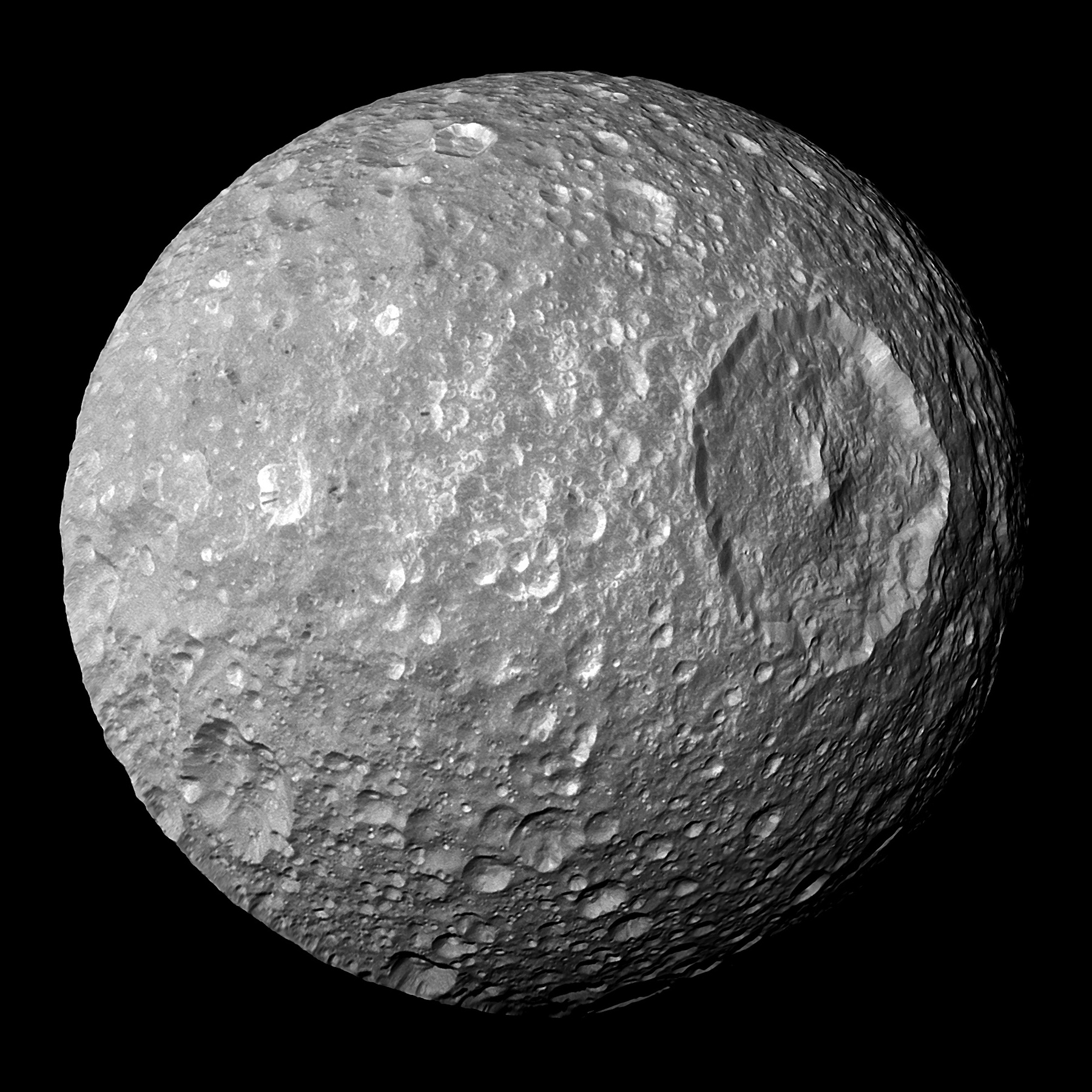
Moon Mimas (Saturn) image by Cassini, 2010

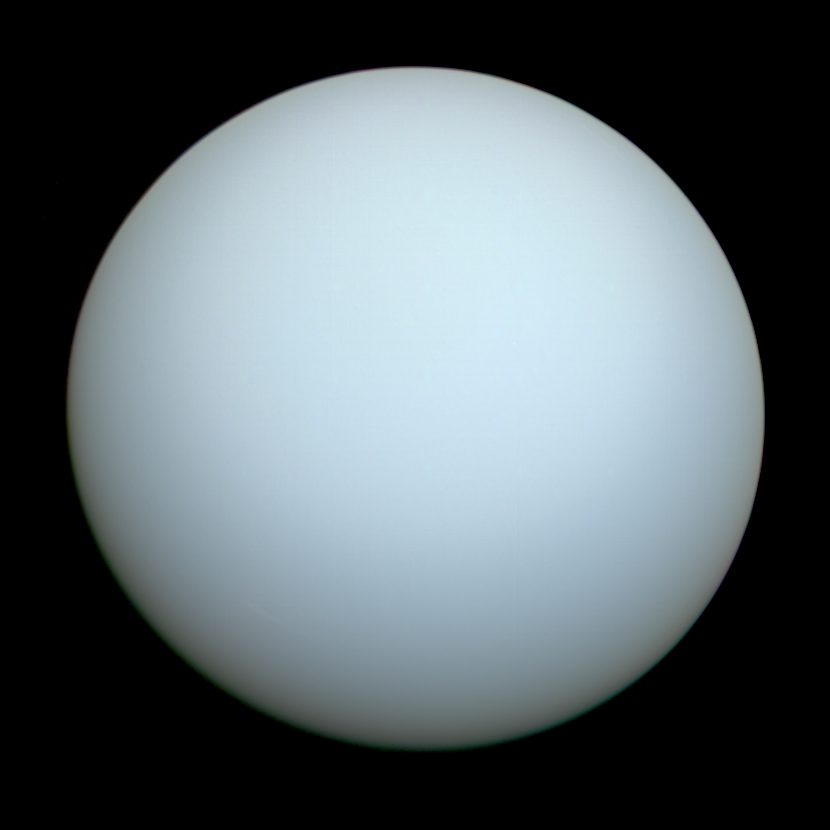
Planet Uranus by Voyager 2, 1986

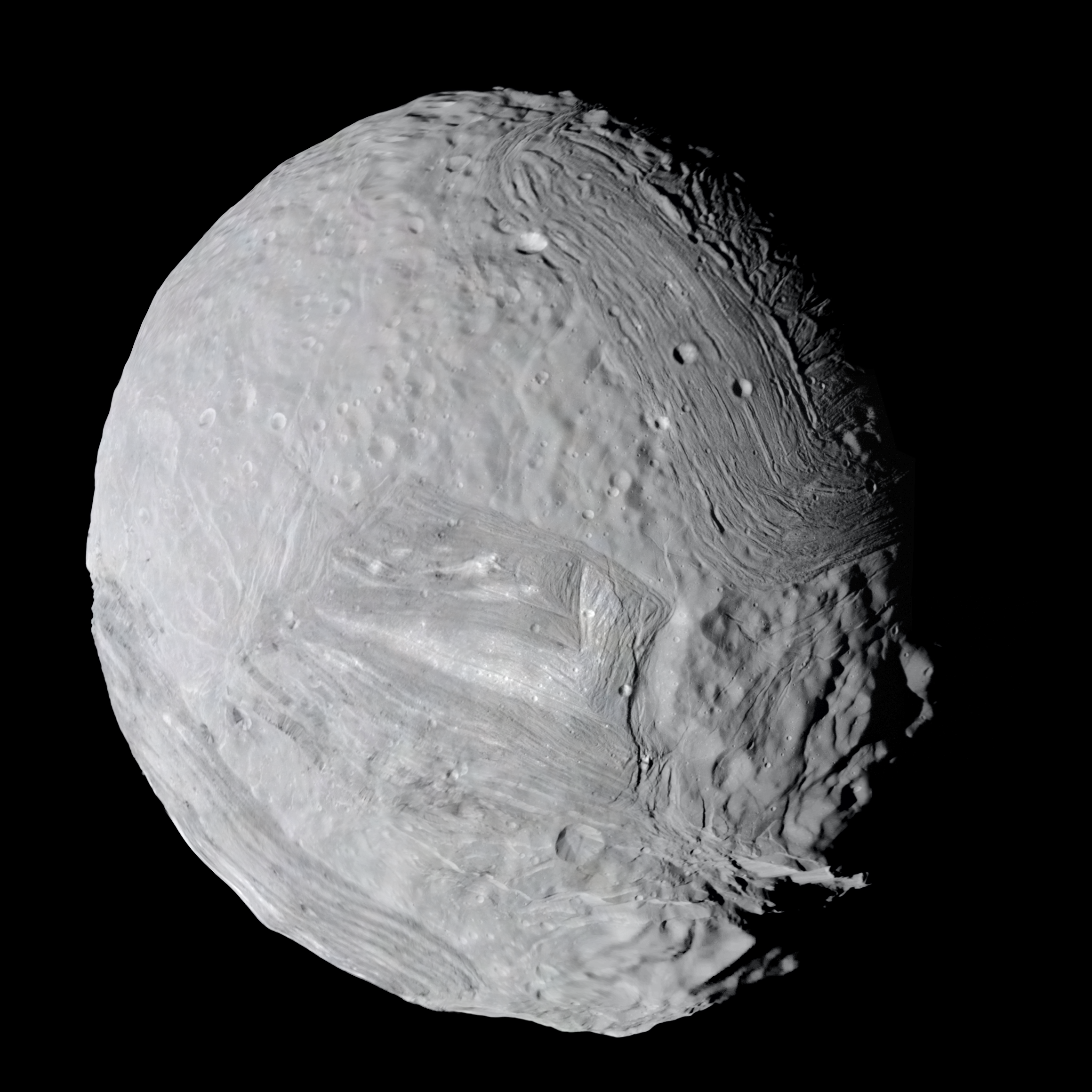
Moon Miranda (Uranus) image by Voyager 2, 1986

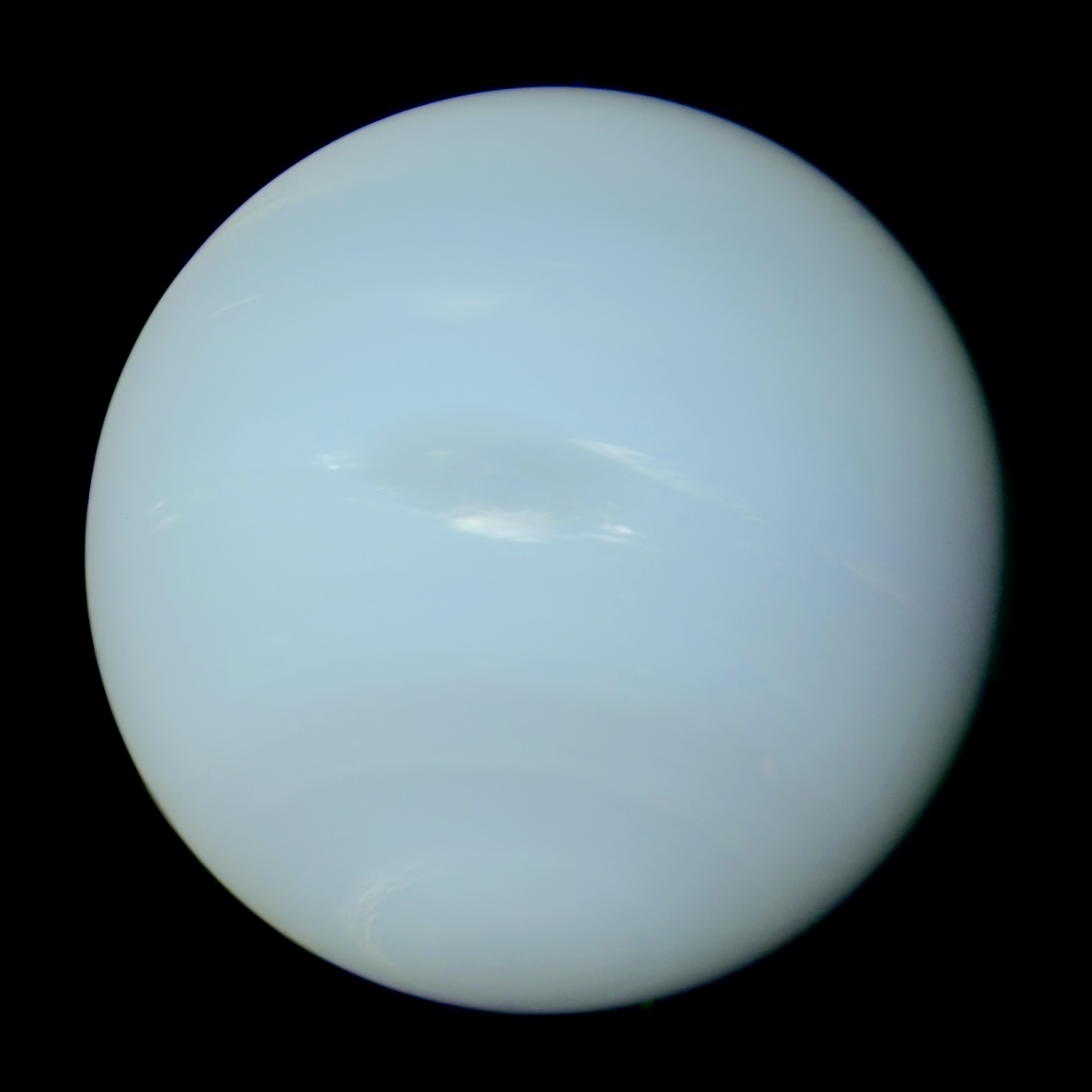
Planet Neptune image by Voyager 2, 1989

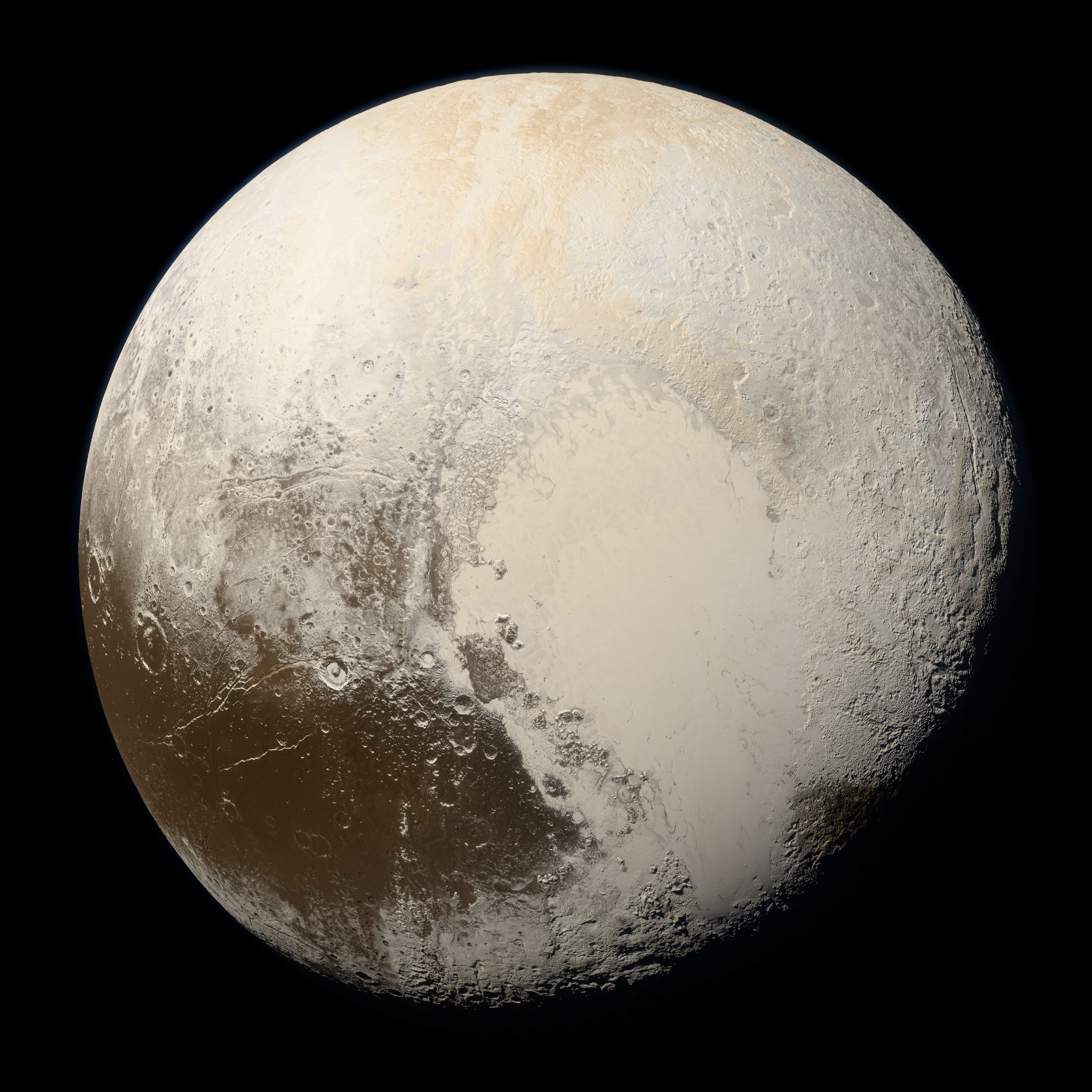
Dwarf planet Pluto image by New Horizons, 2015

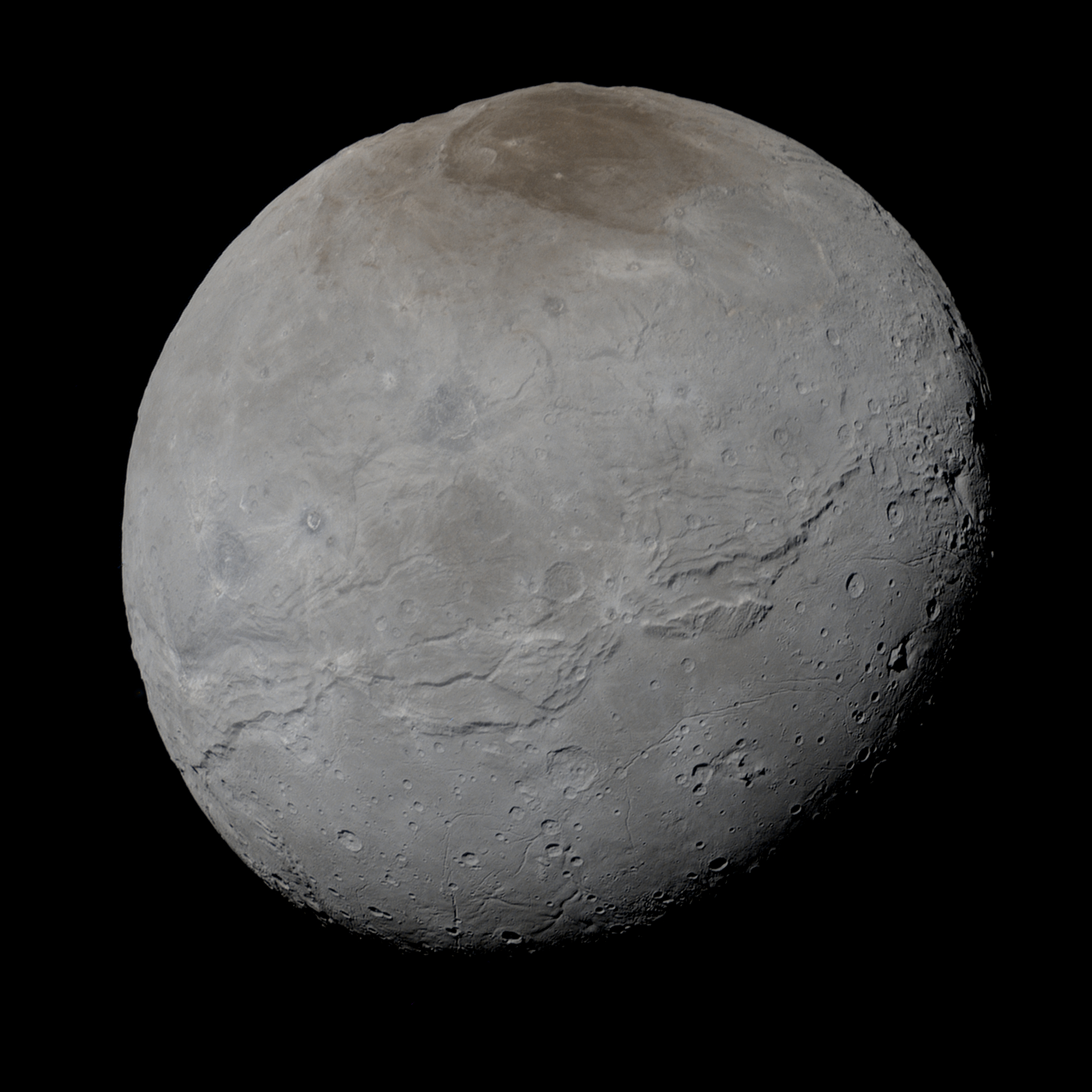
Moon Charon (Pluto) image by New Horizons, 2015

=== NASA Great Observatory images ===
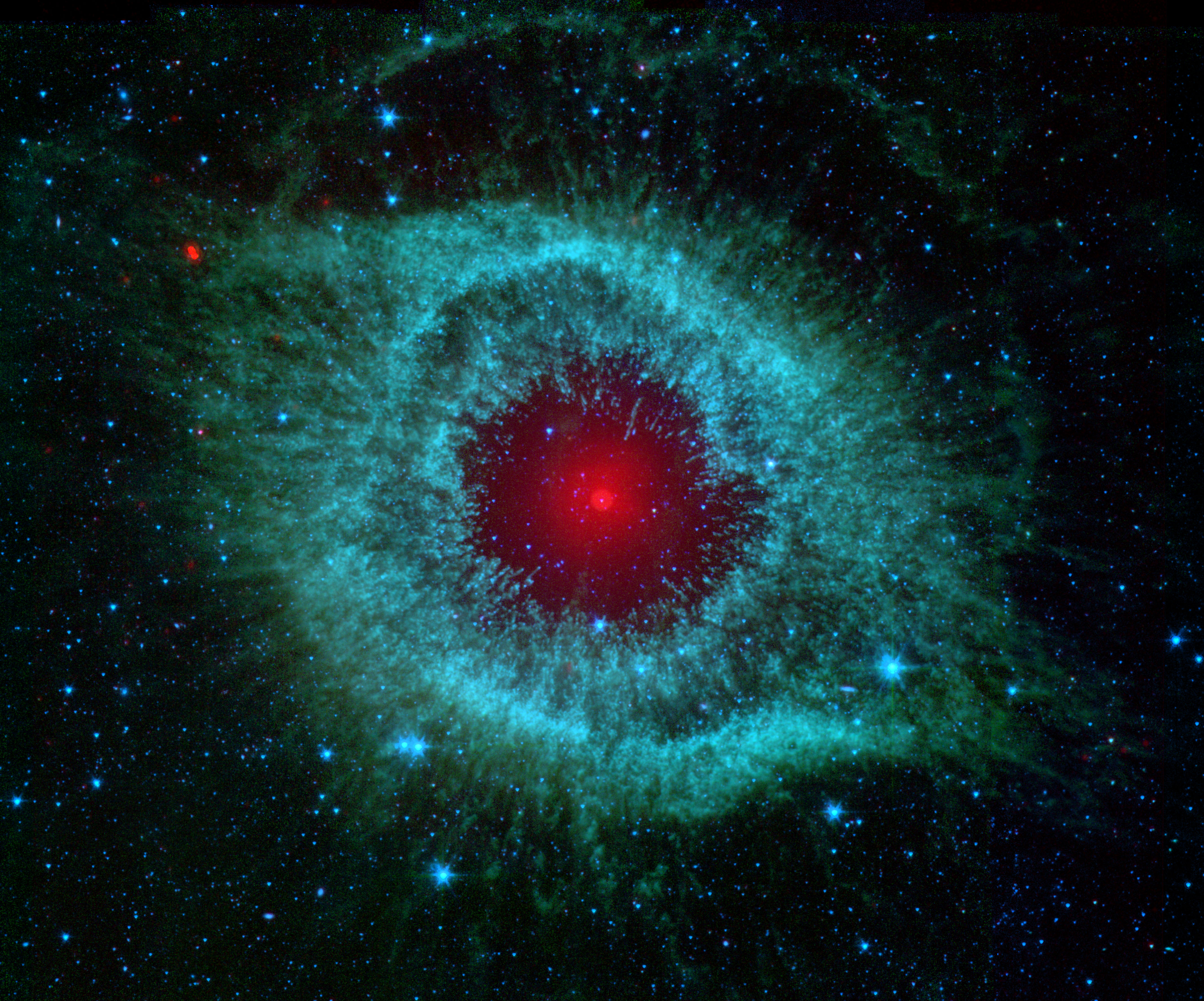
Helix Nebula by Spitzer Space Telescope, 2007

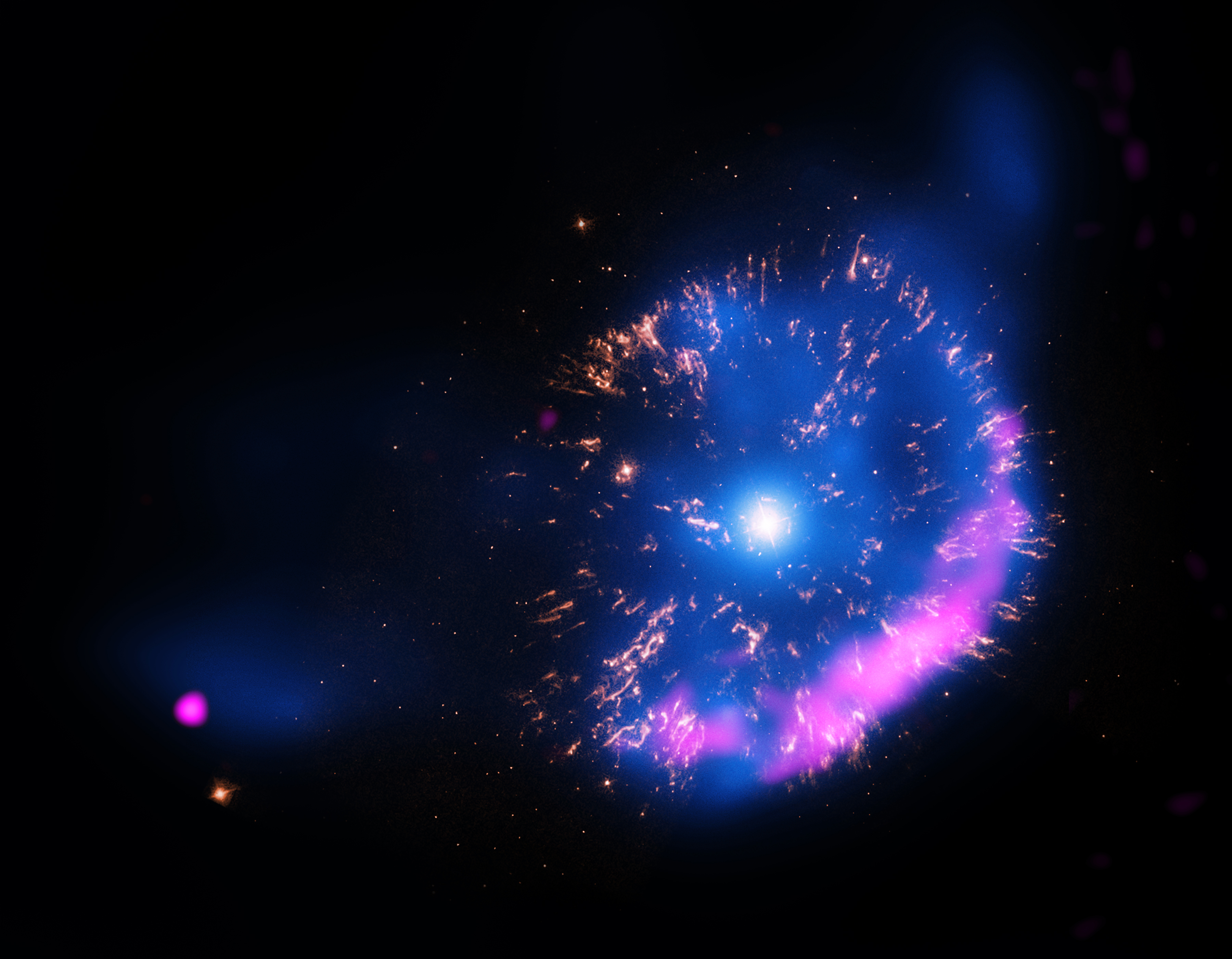
1901 GK Persei supernova by Chandra X-ray Observatory, 2015

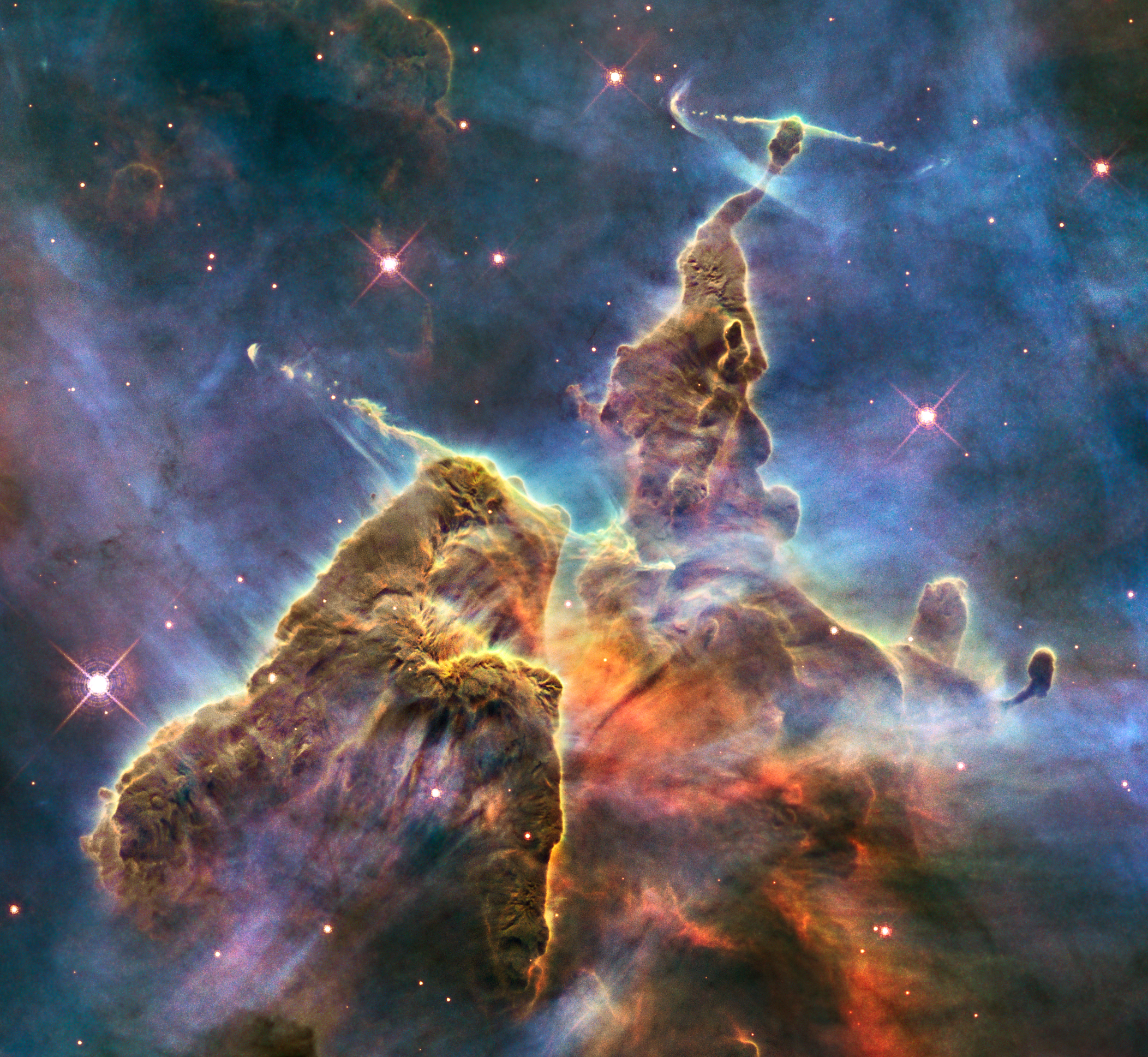
Carina Nebula by Hubble Space Telescope, 2010

Stephens quintet by James Webb Space Telescope, Jul 2022

=== NASA spacecraft ===
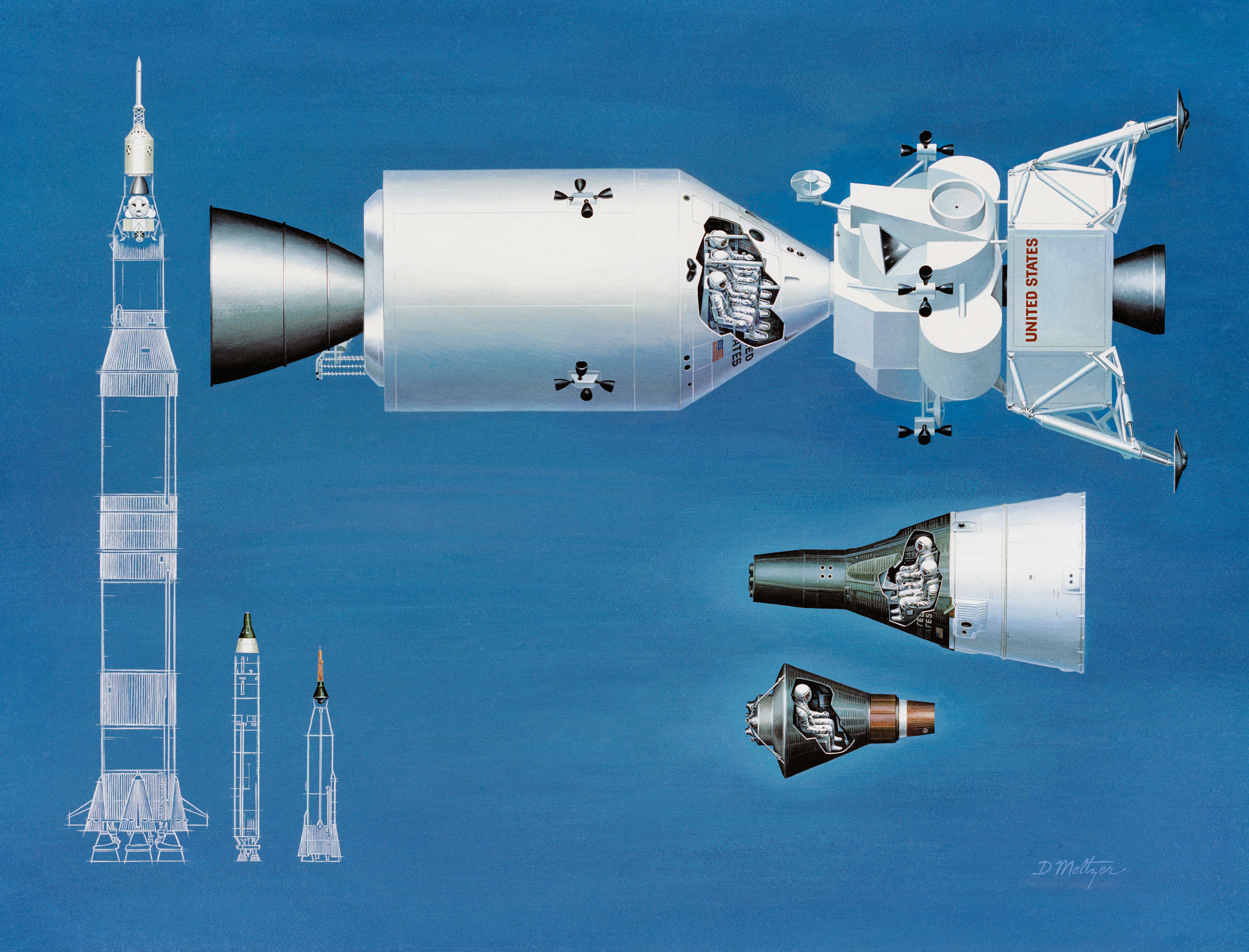
Comparison of Apollo, Gemini, and Mercury systems (Note: From left to right: Launch vehicle of Apollo (Saturn 5), Gemini (Titan 2) and Mercury (Atlas). Left, top-down: Spacecraft of Apollo, Gemini and Mercury. The Saturn IB and Mercury-Redstone launch vehicles are left out.)

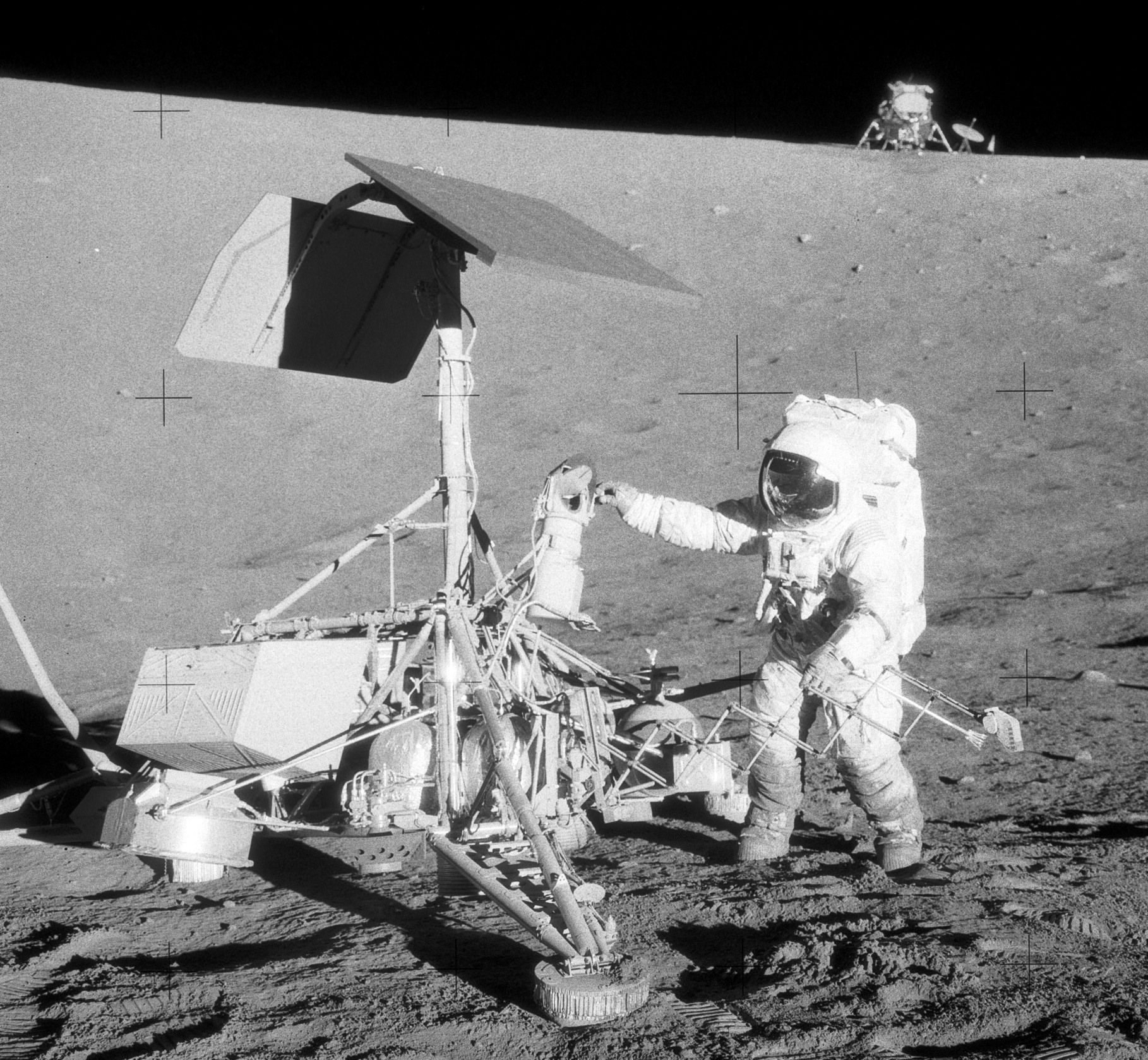
Surveyor 3, Pete Conrad, and Apollo 12 on the Moon, 1969

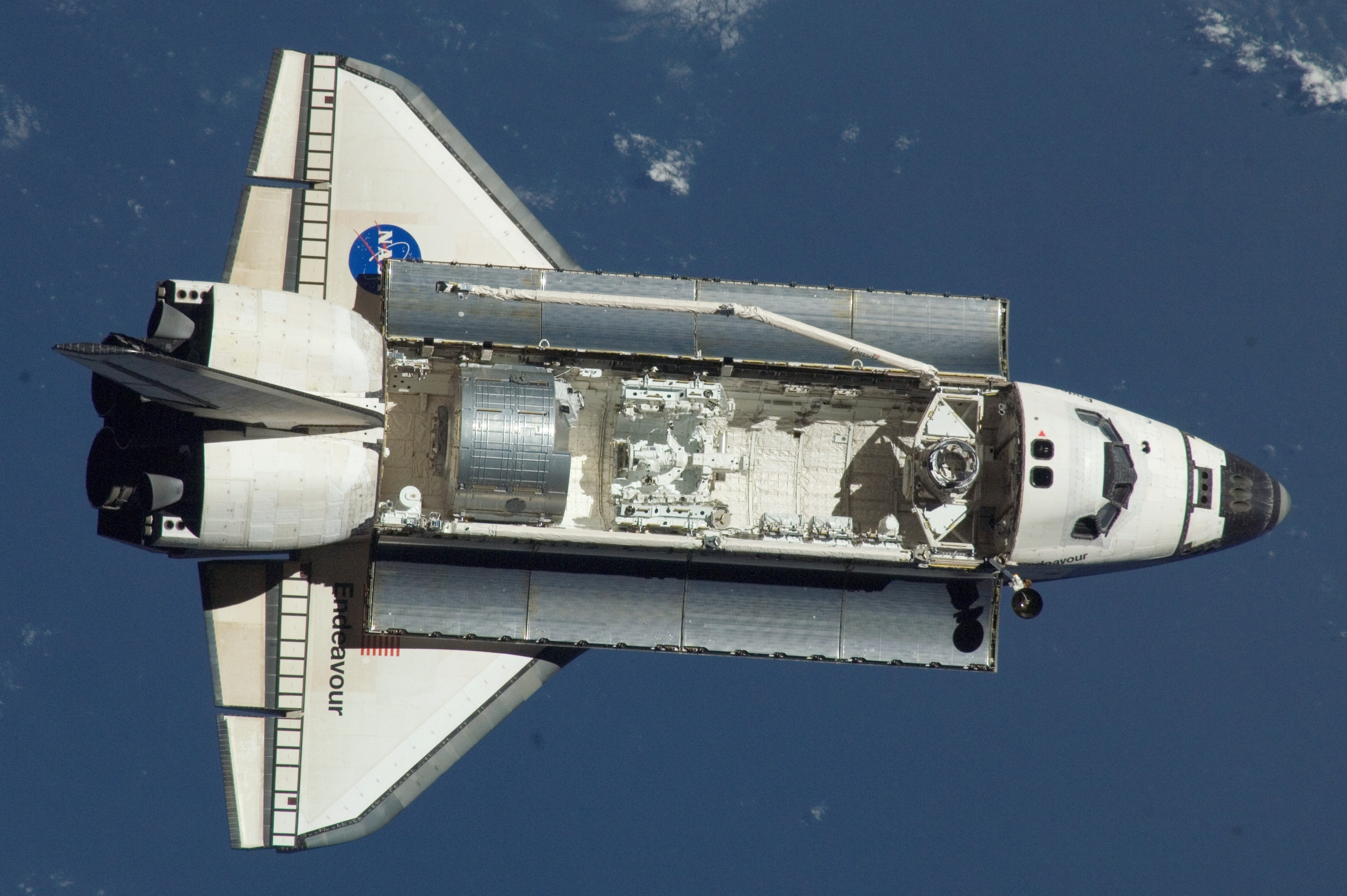
Space Shuttle Endeavor in orbit, 2008

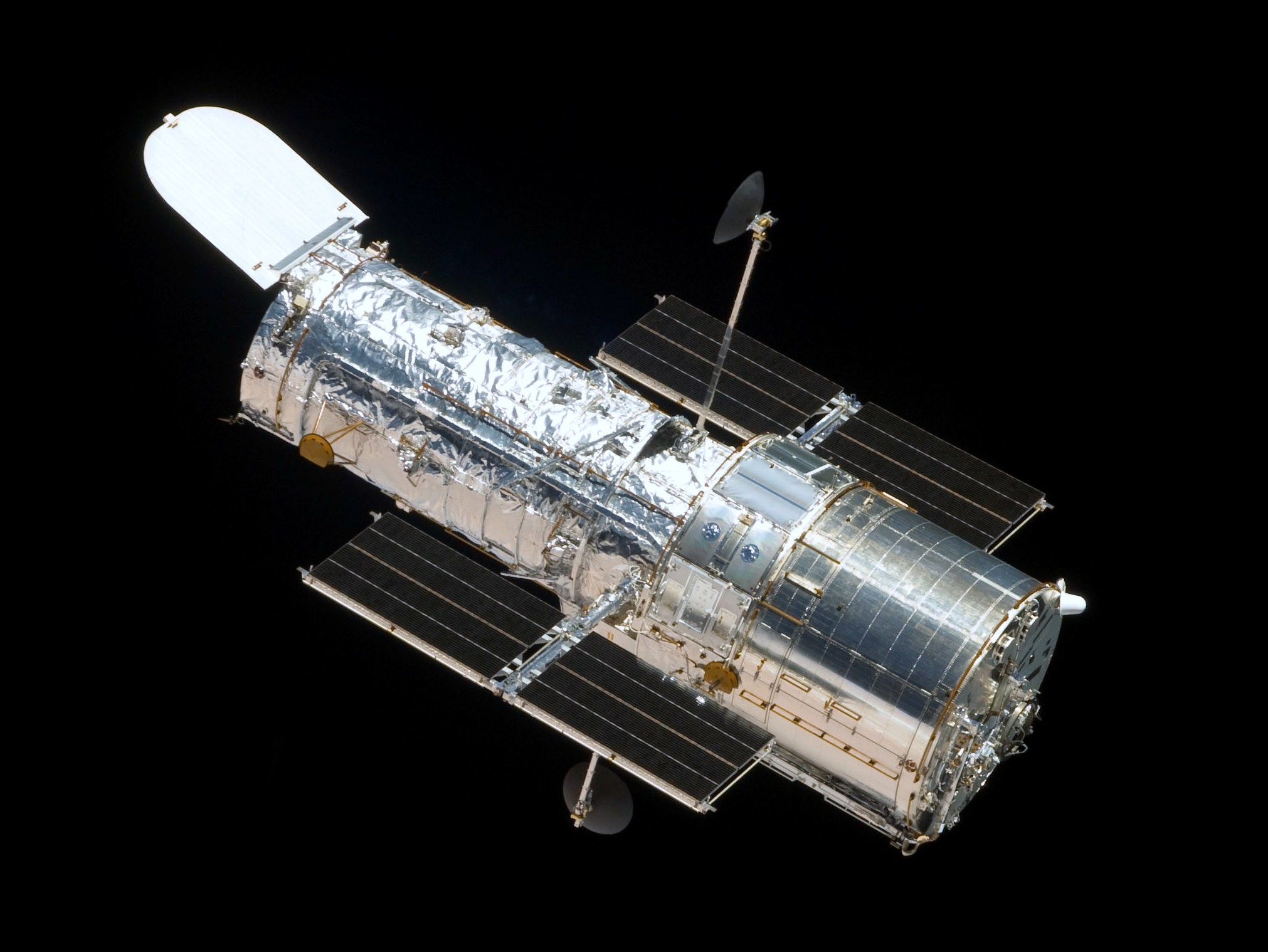
Hubble Space Telescope released in orbit after servicing, 2009.

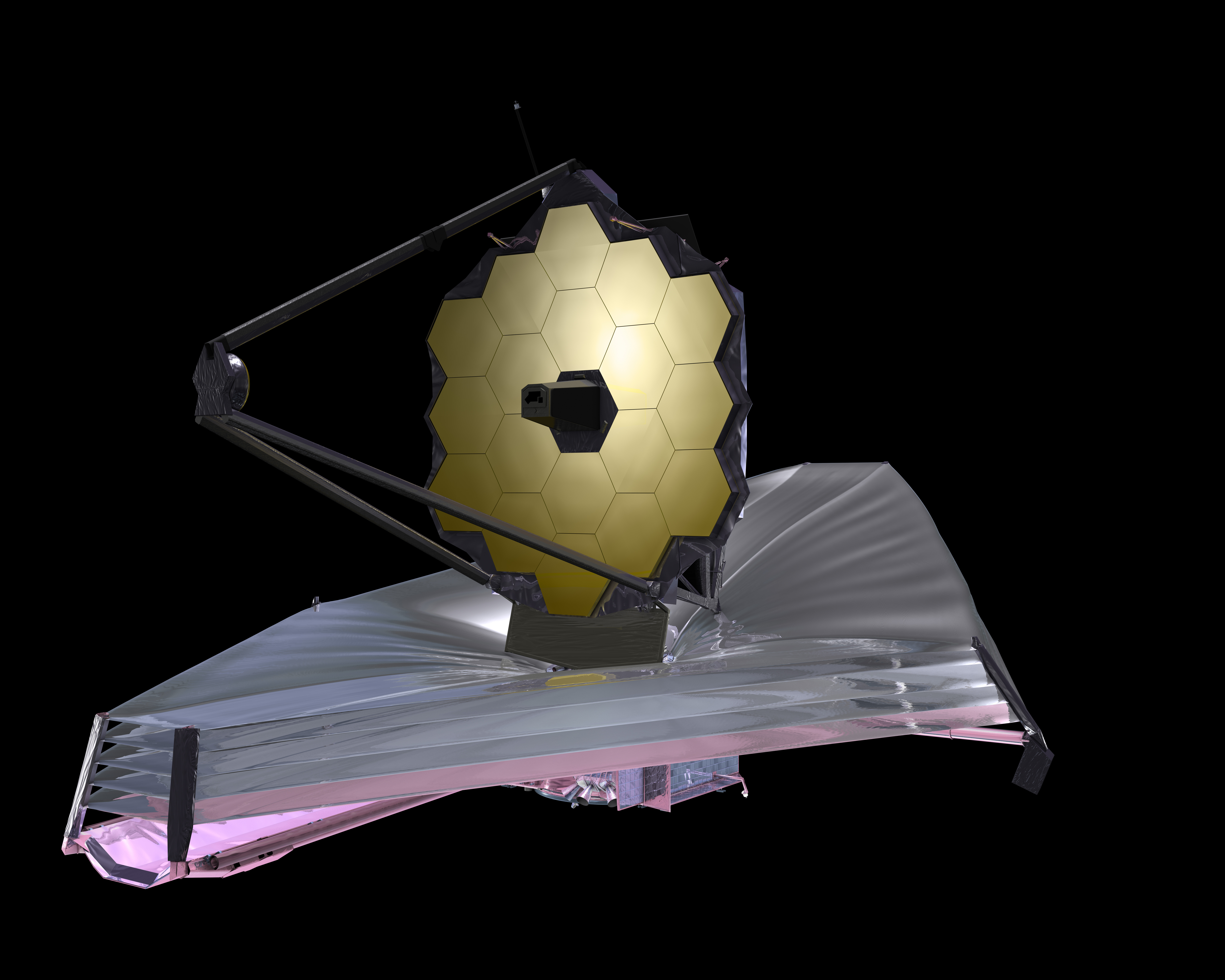
James Webb Space Telescope now in orbit, 2025.

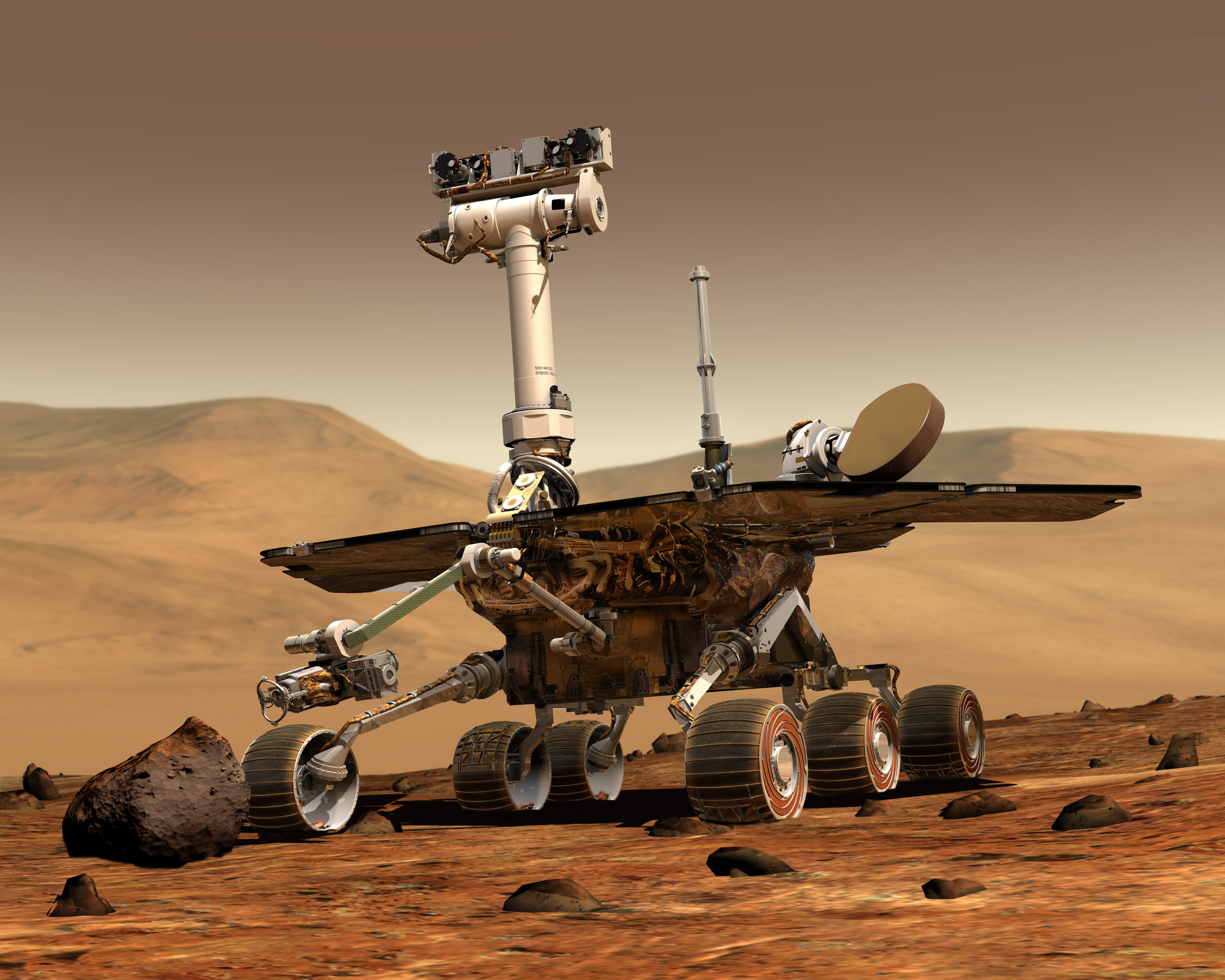
Opportunity rover on surface of Mars (rendering), 2003

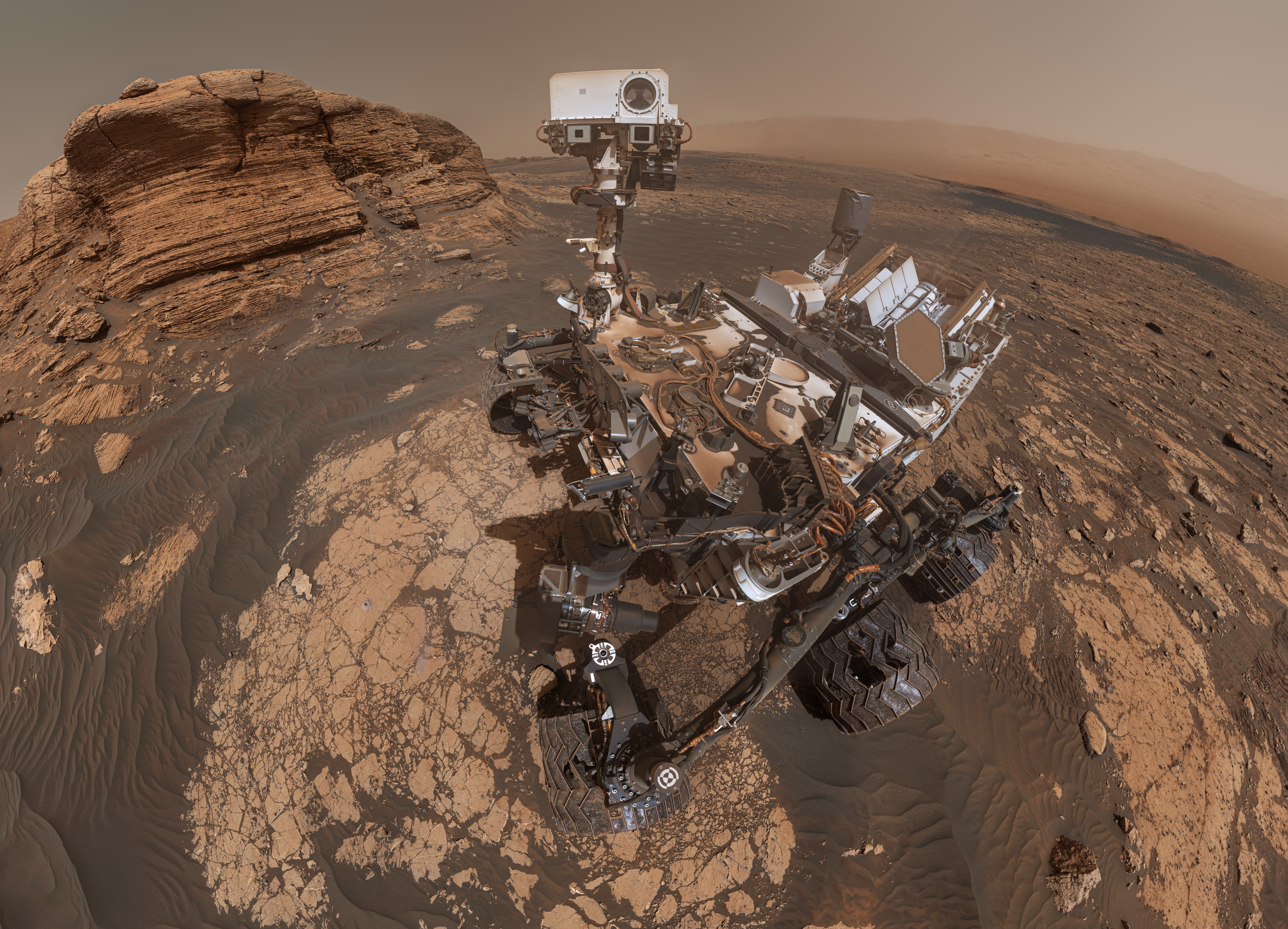
Curiosity rover self-portrait on Mars, 2021

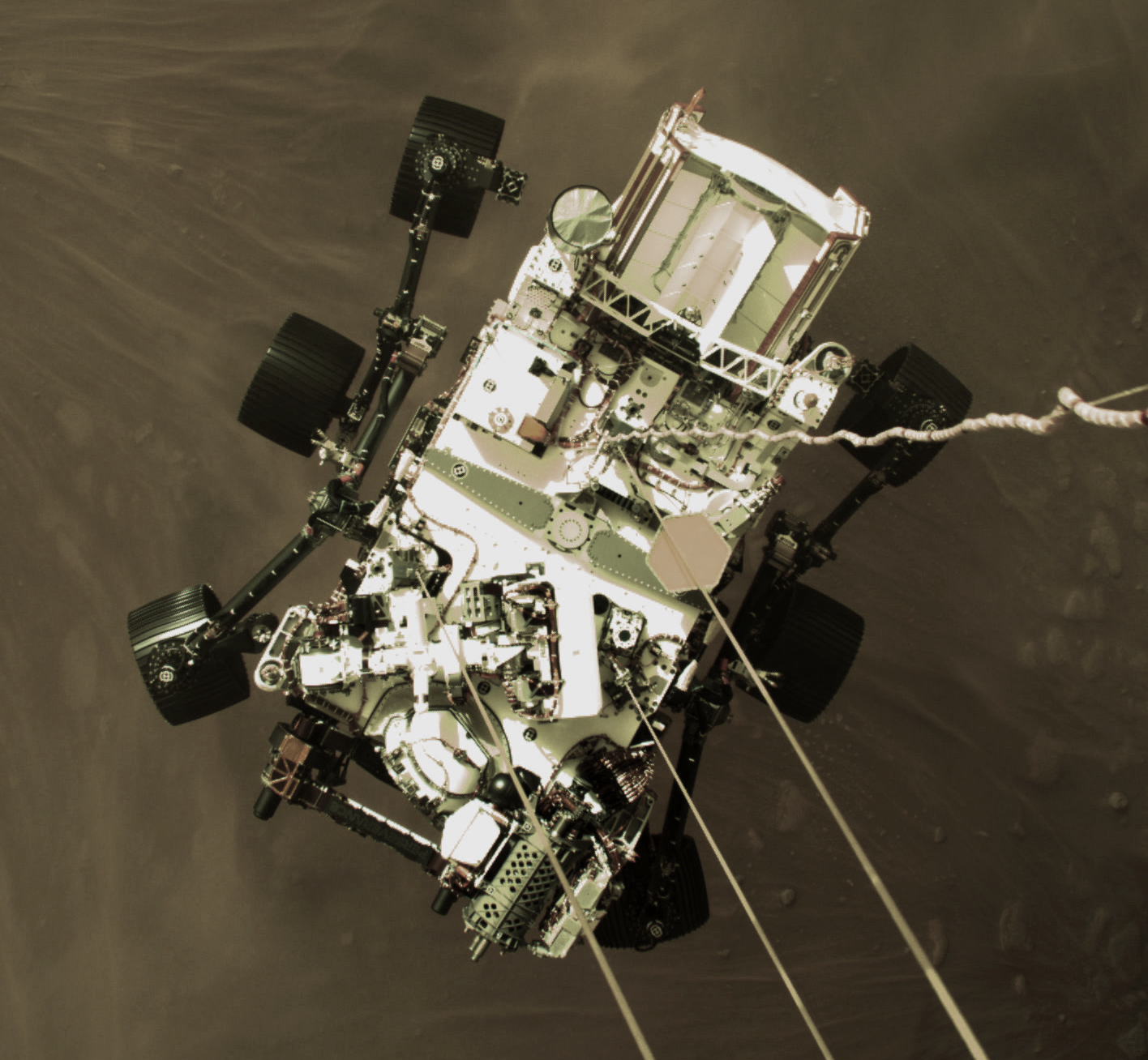
Perseverance rover during Mars skycrane landing, February 2021

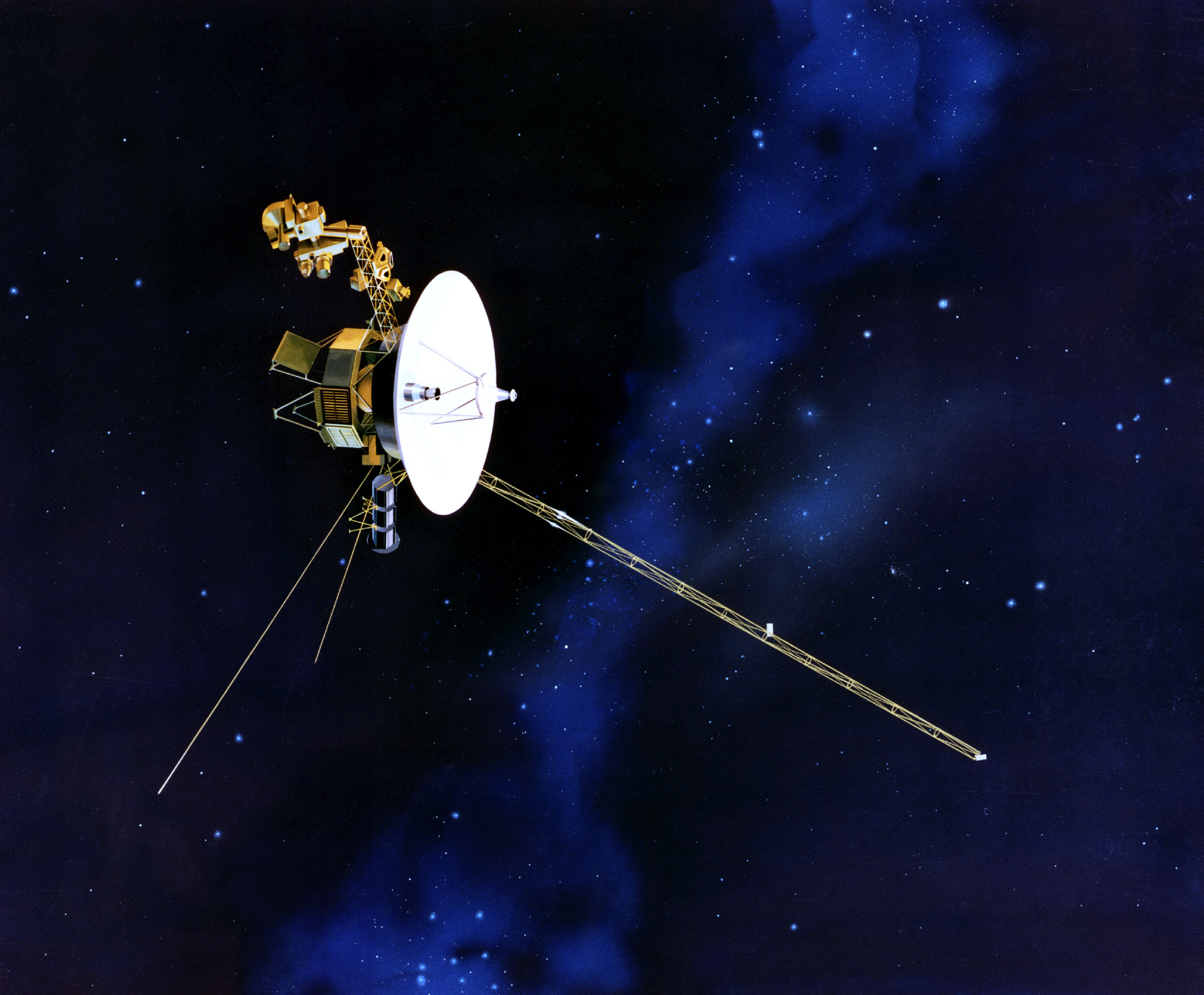
Voyager 2, now 21.1 billion kilometers from the Earth, June 2025

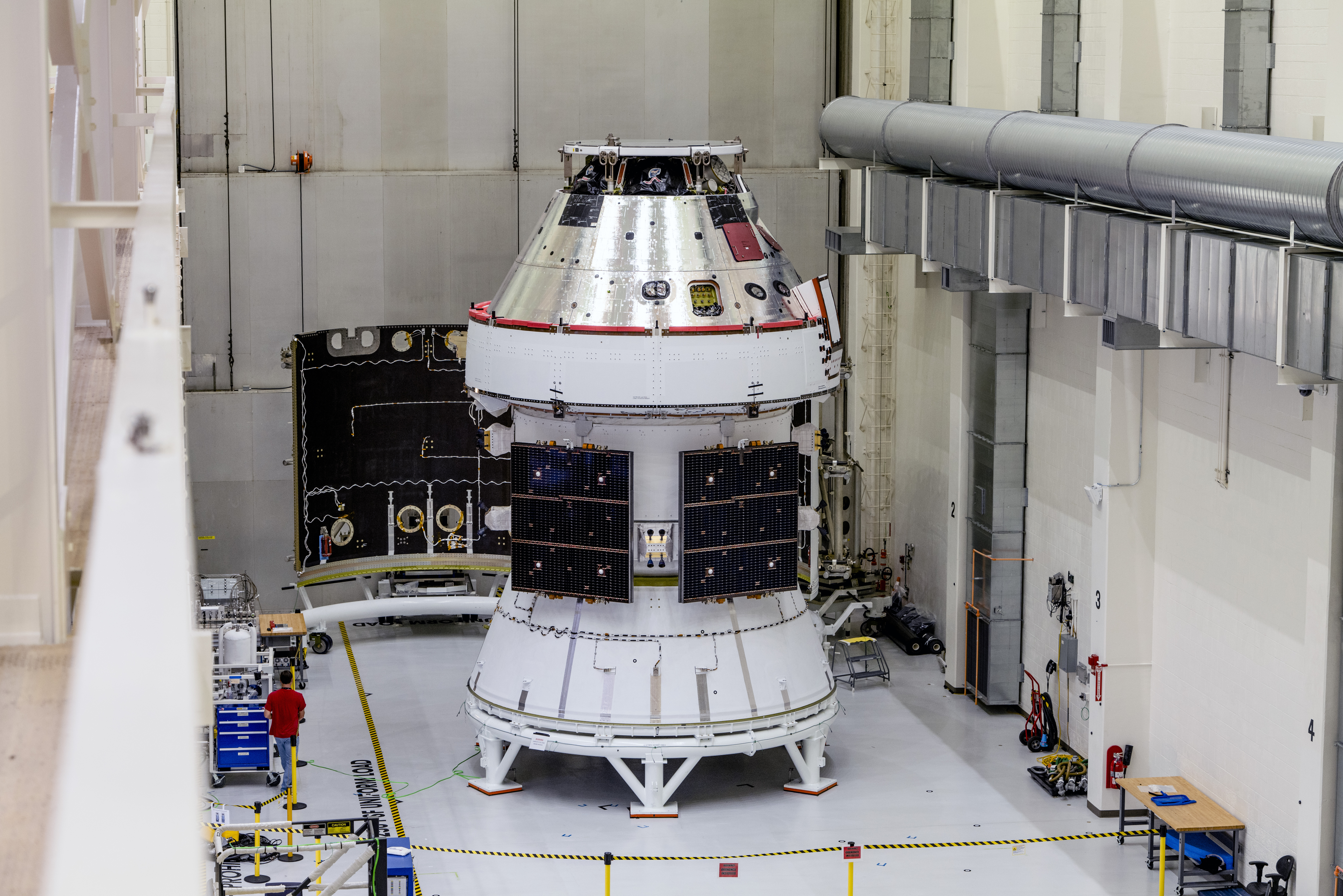
Orion spacecraft and European Service Module testing, 2020

=== NASA space launch systems ===
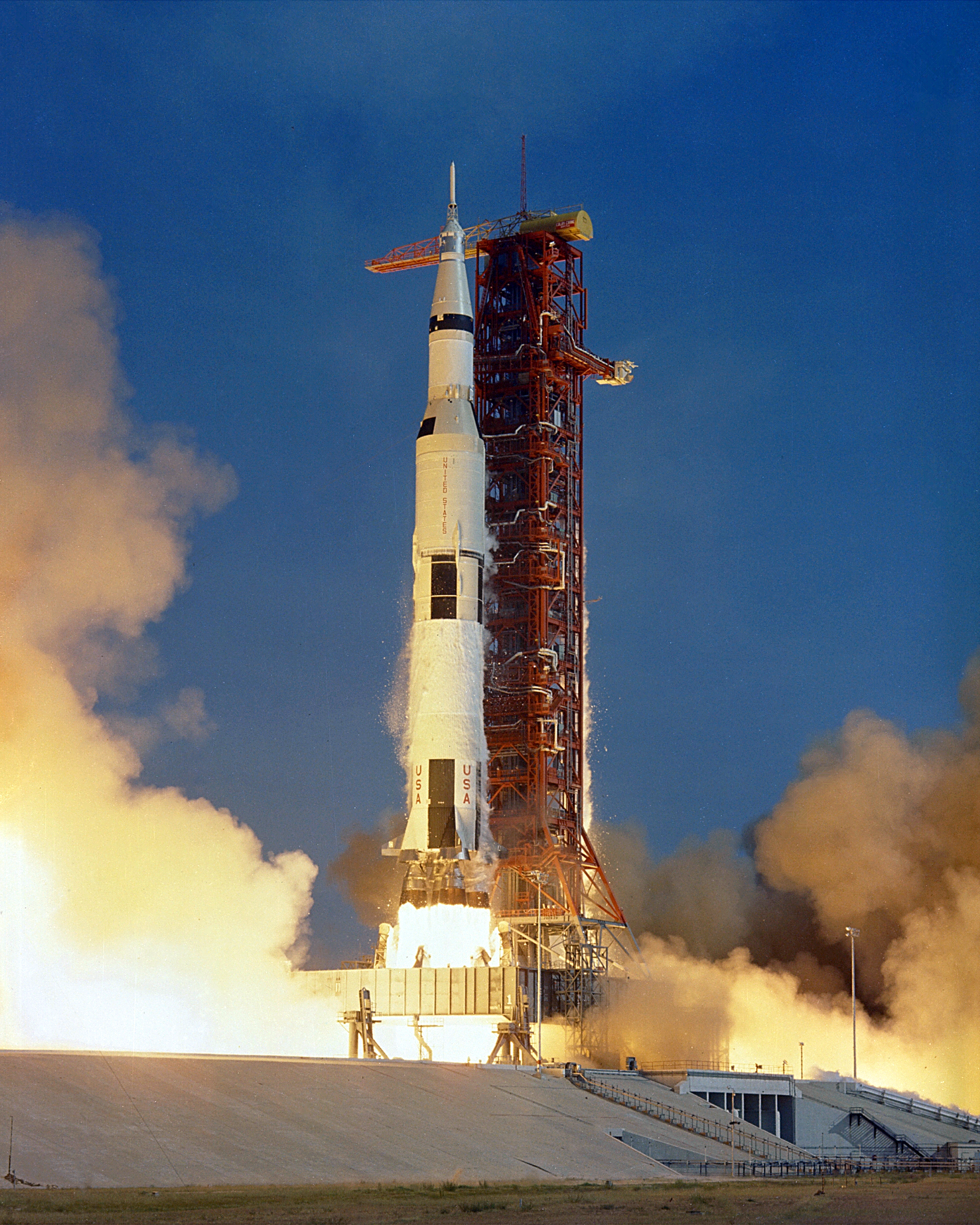
Saturn V and Apollo 11 at launch, Jul 1969

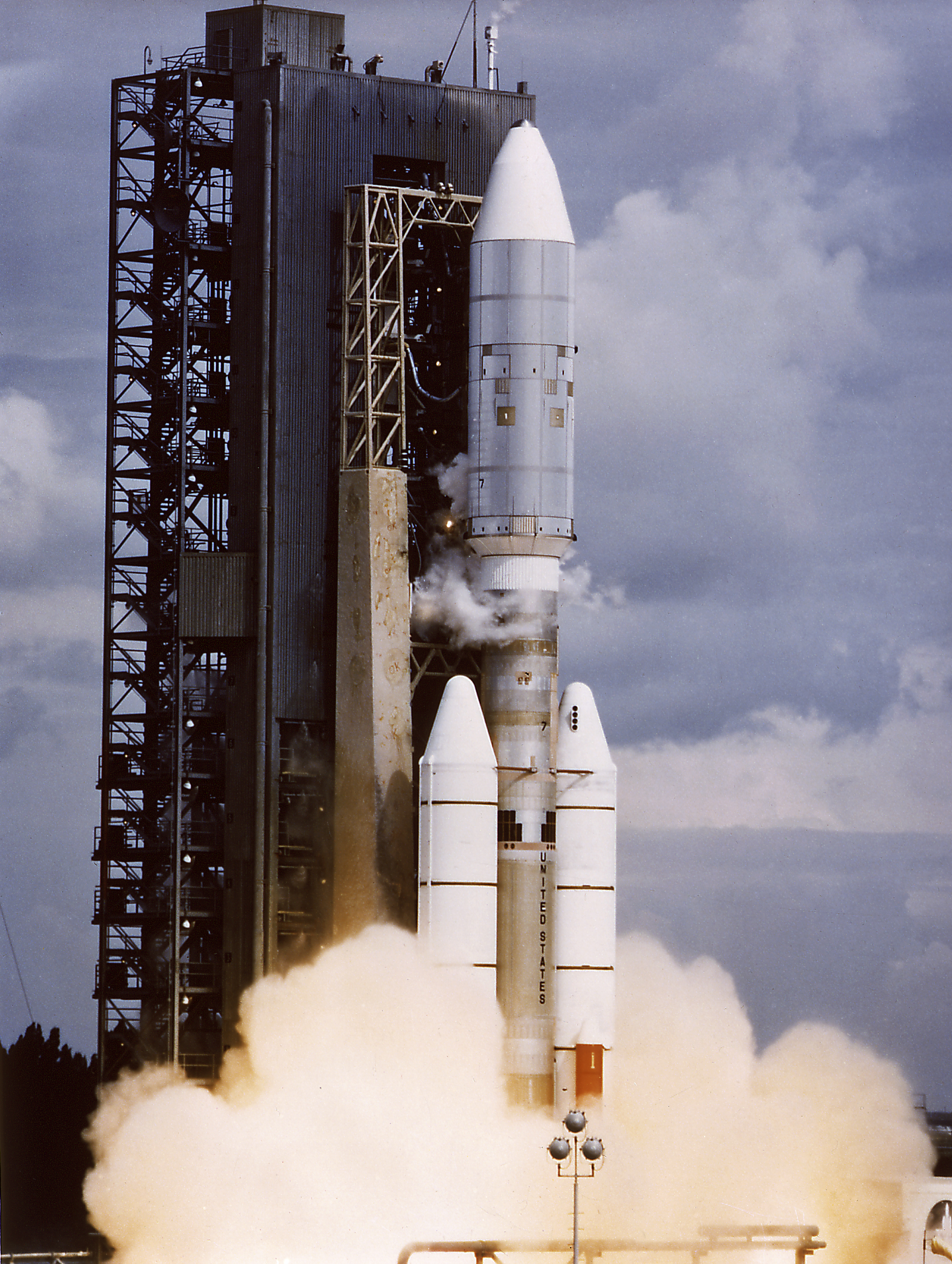
Titan III/Centaur launching Voyager 2 spacecraft, Jul 1977

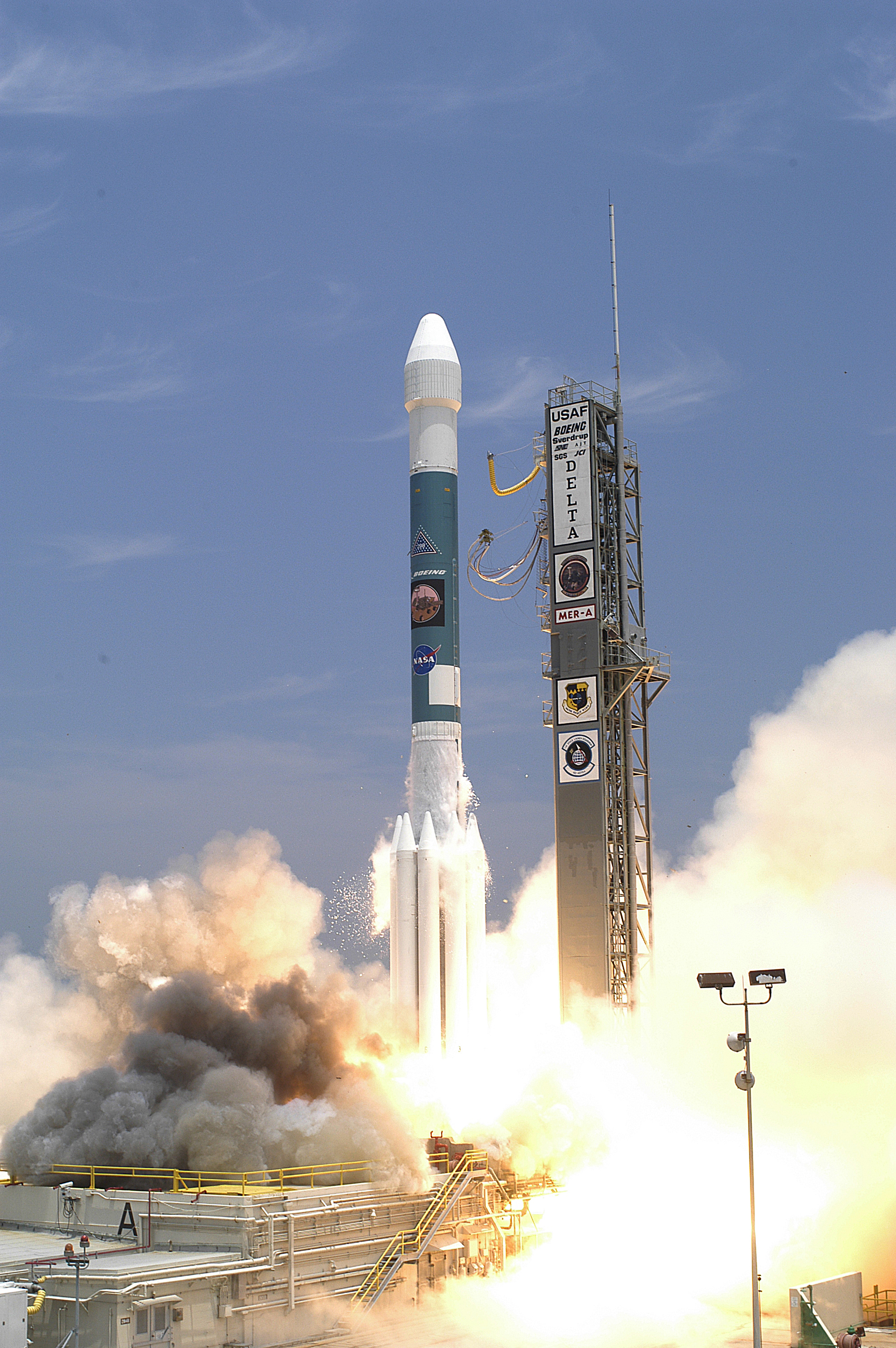
Delta II launching Spirit rover, Jun 2003

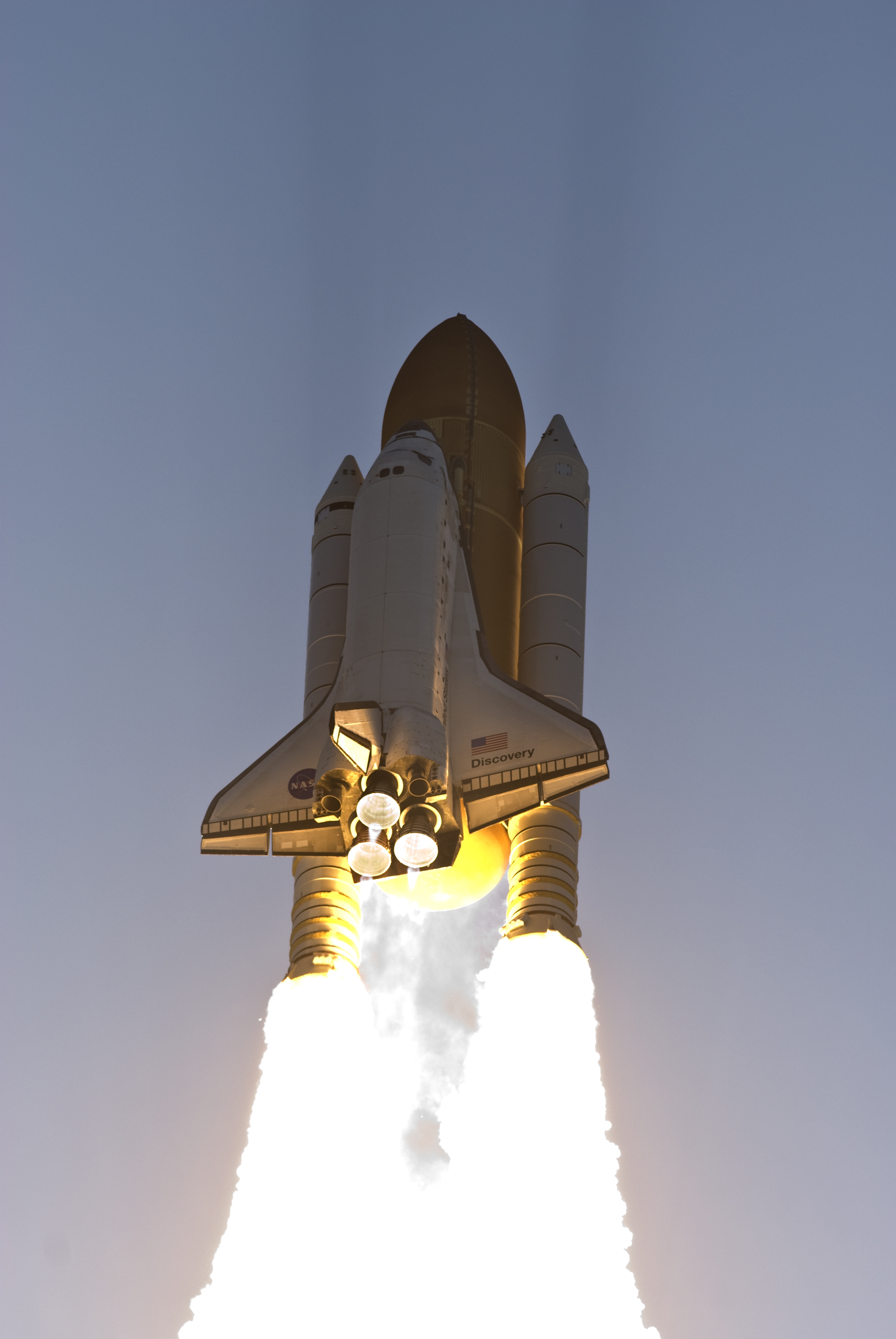
Space Shuttle (STS-124) during launch, May 2008

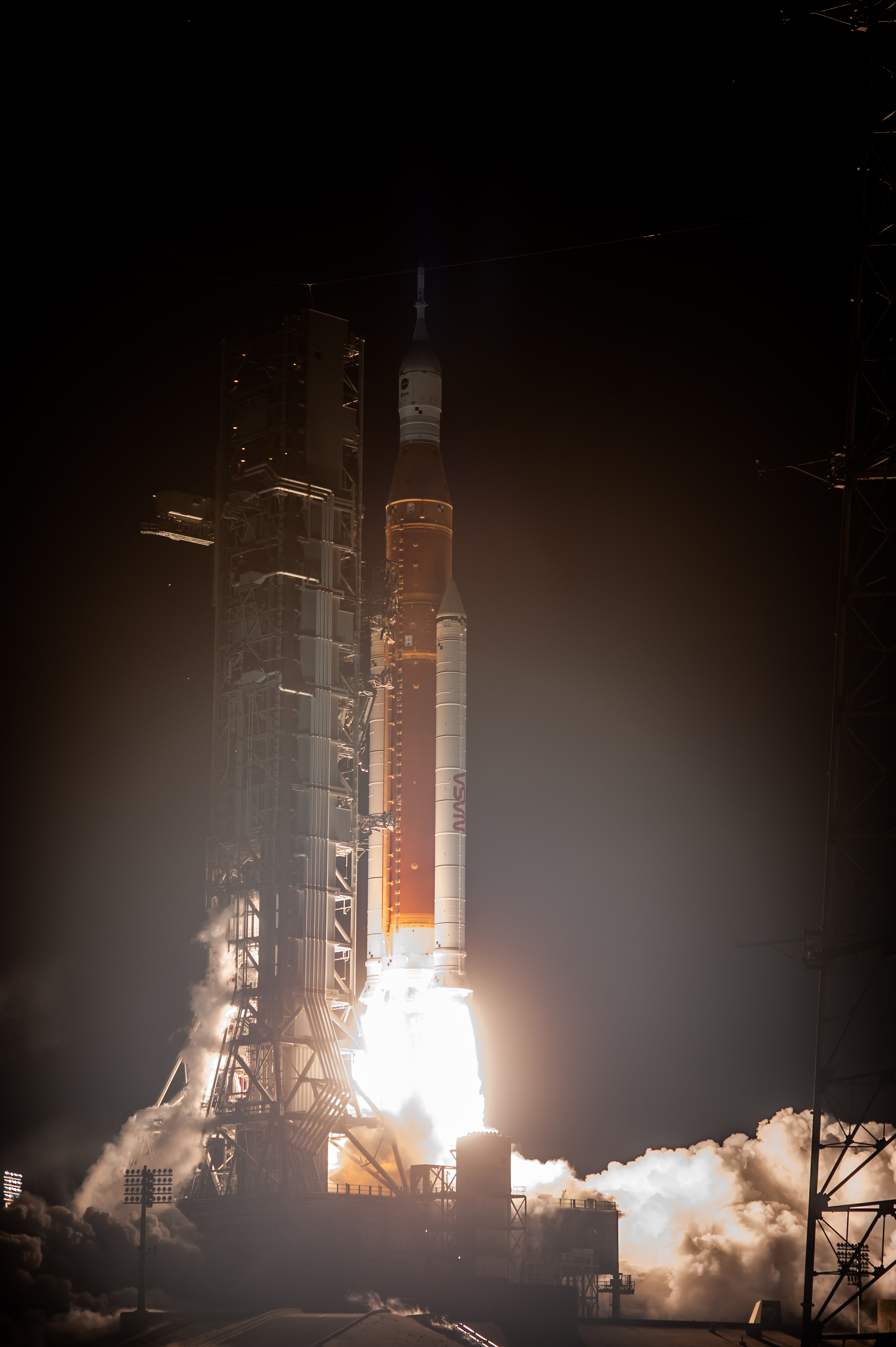
Space Launch System and Artemis I at launch, Nov 2022

=== Concepts and plans ===
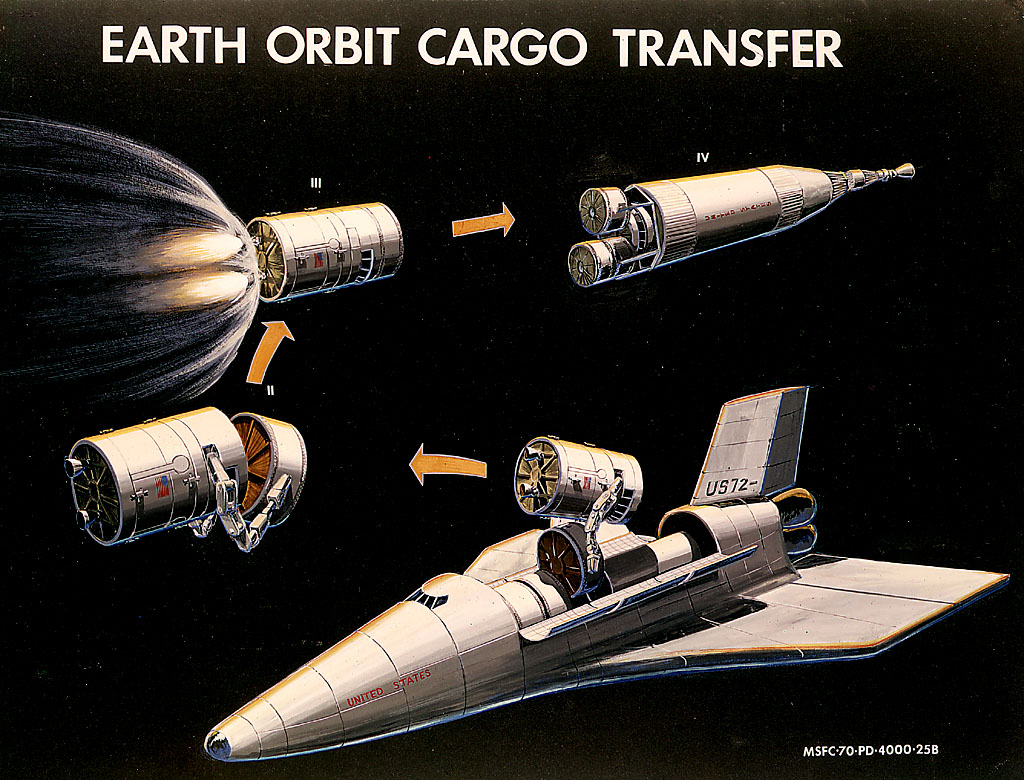
Concept of space tug cargo transport to a Nuclear Shuttle, 1960s

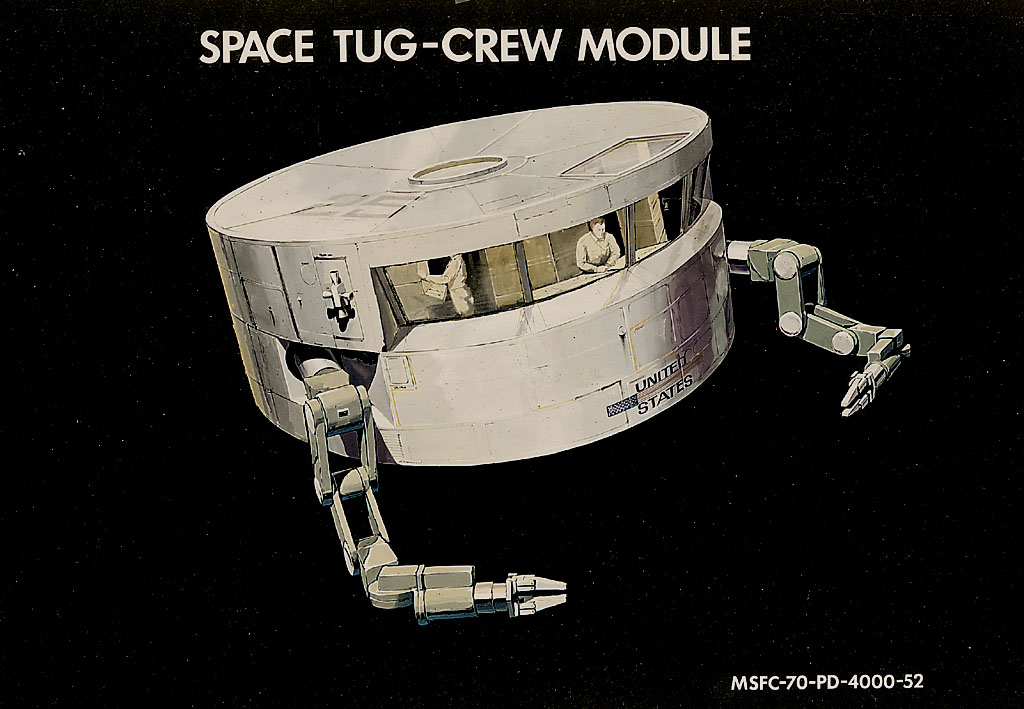
Space Tug concept, 1970s

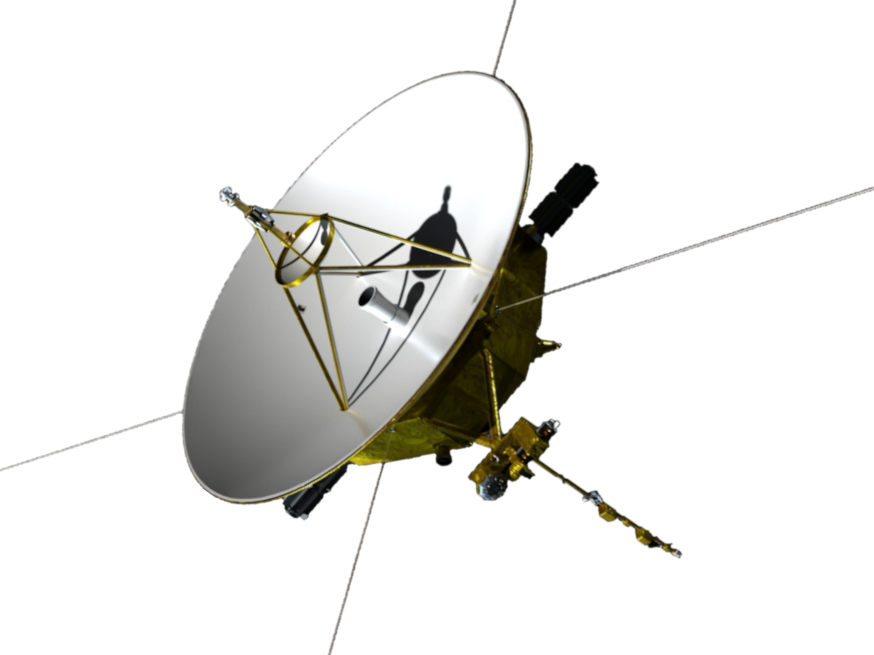
NASA Interstellar probe concept, 2022

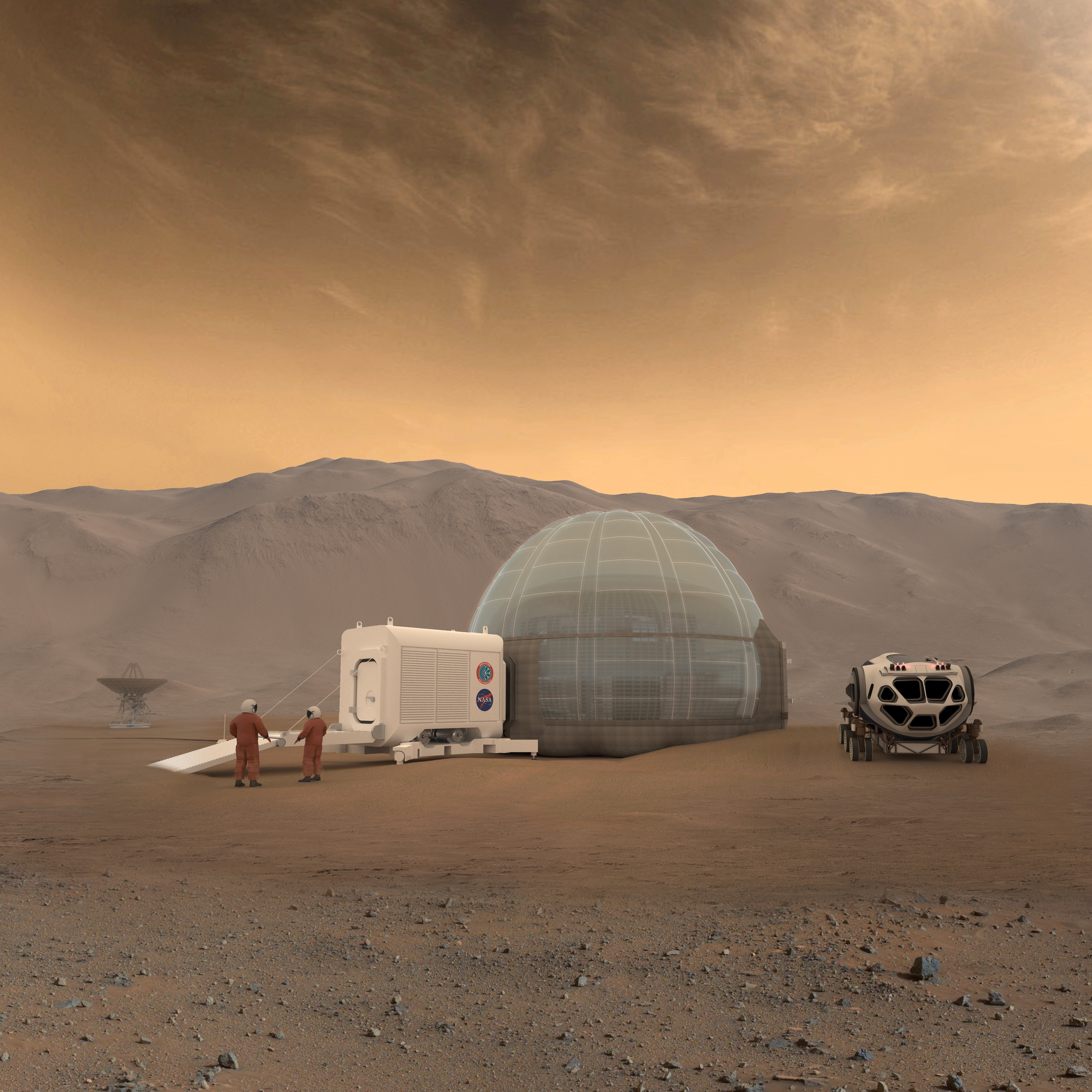
Langley's Mars Ice Dome design for a Mars habitat, 2010s

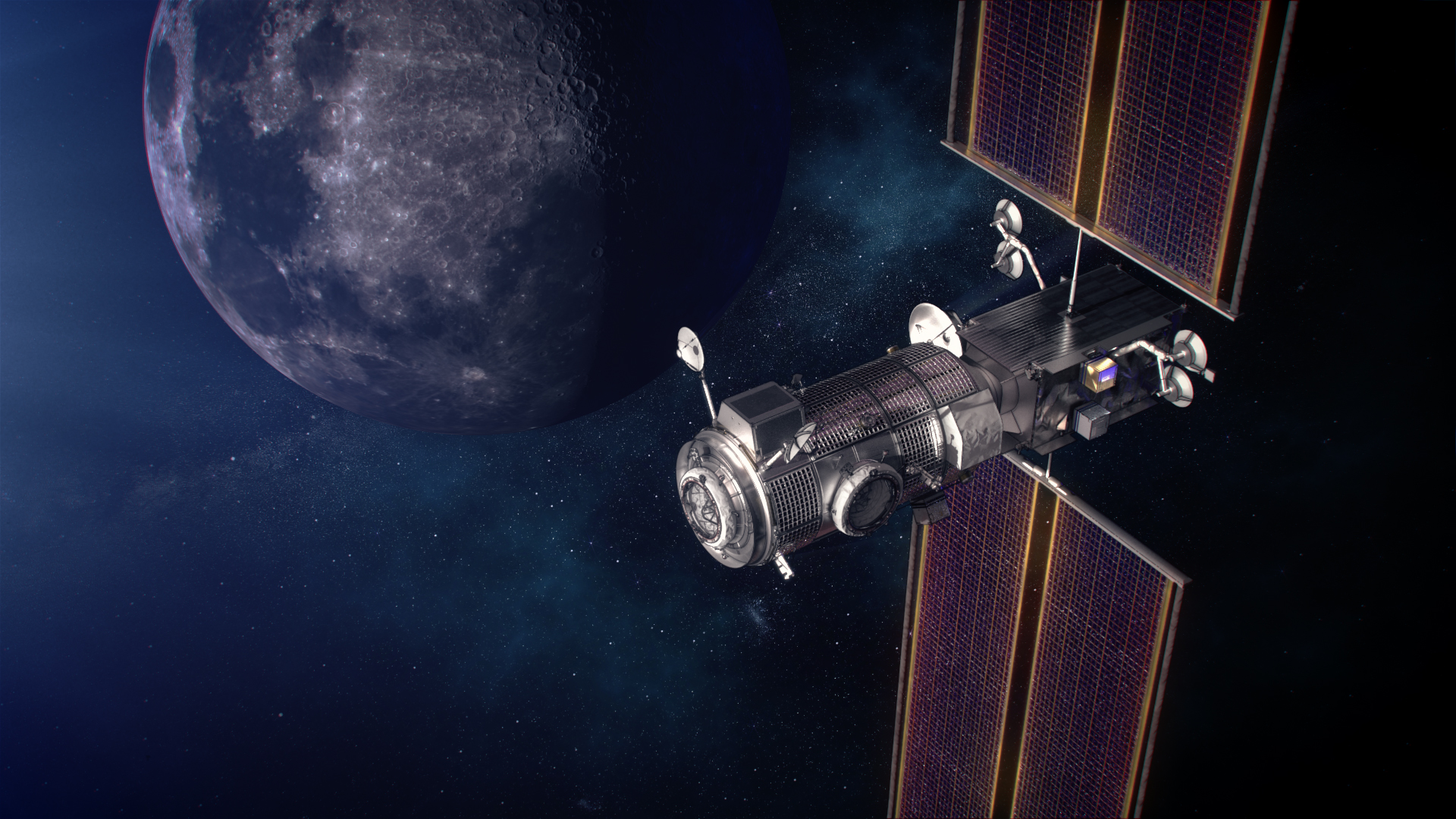
Lunar Gateway space station, 2020

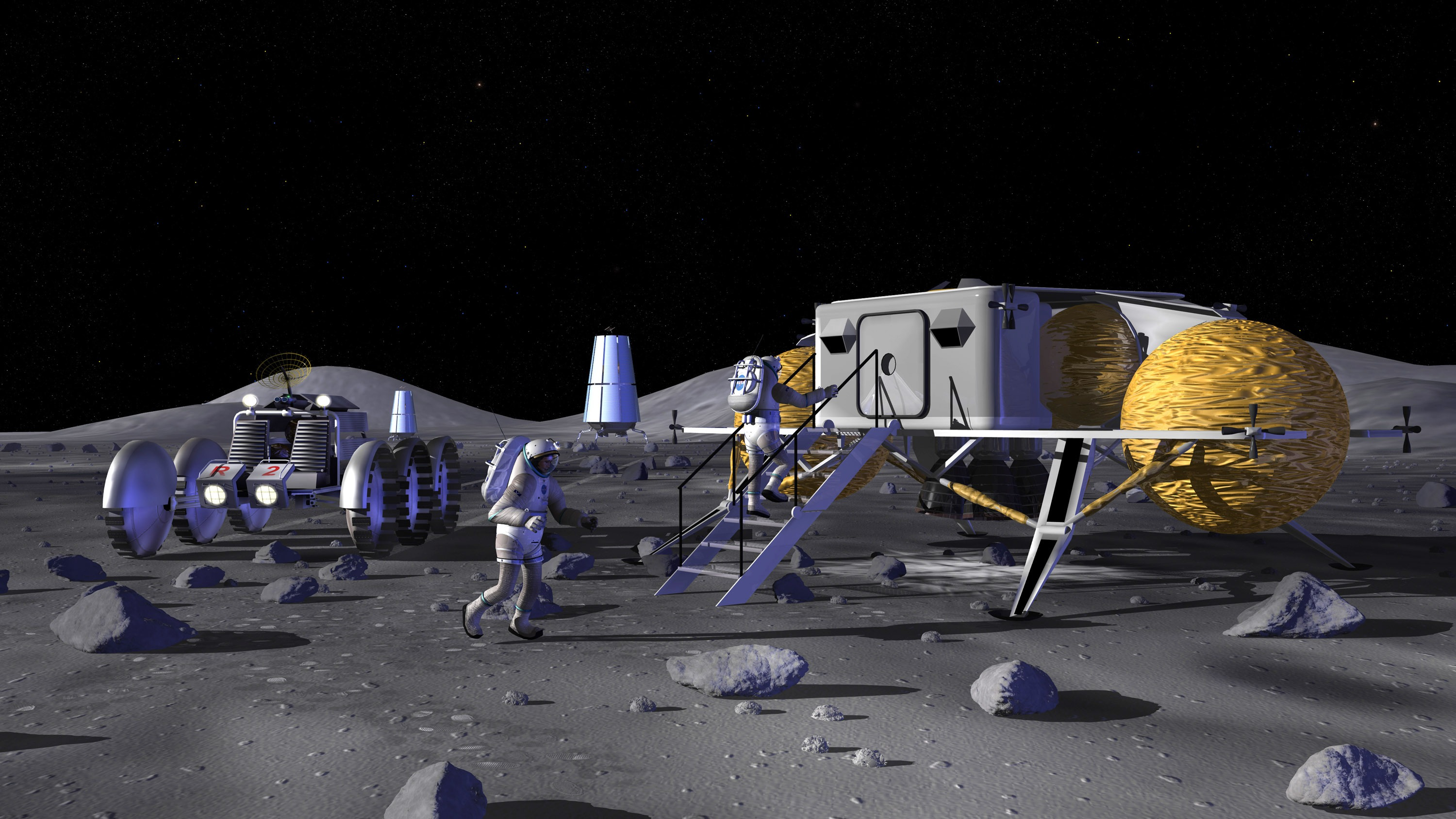
NASA lunar outpost concept, 2006

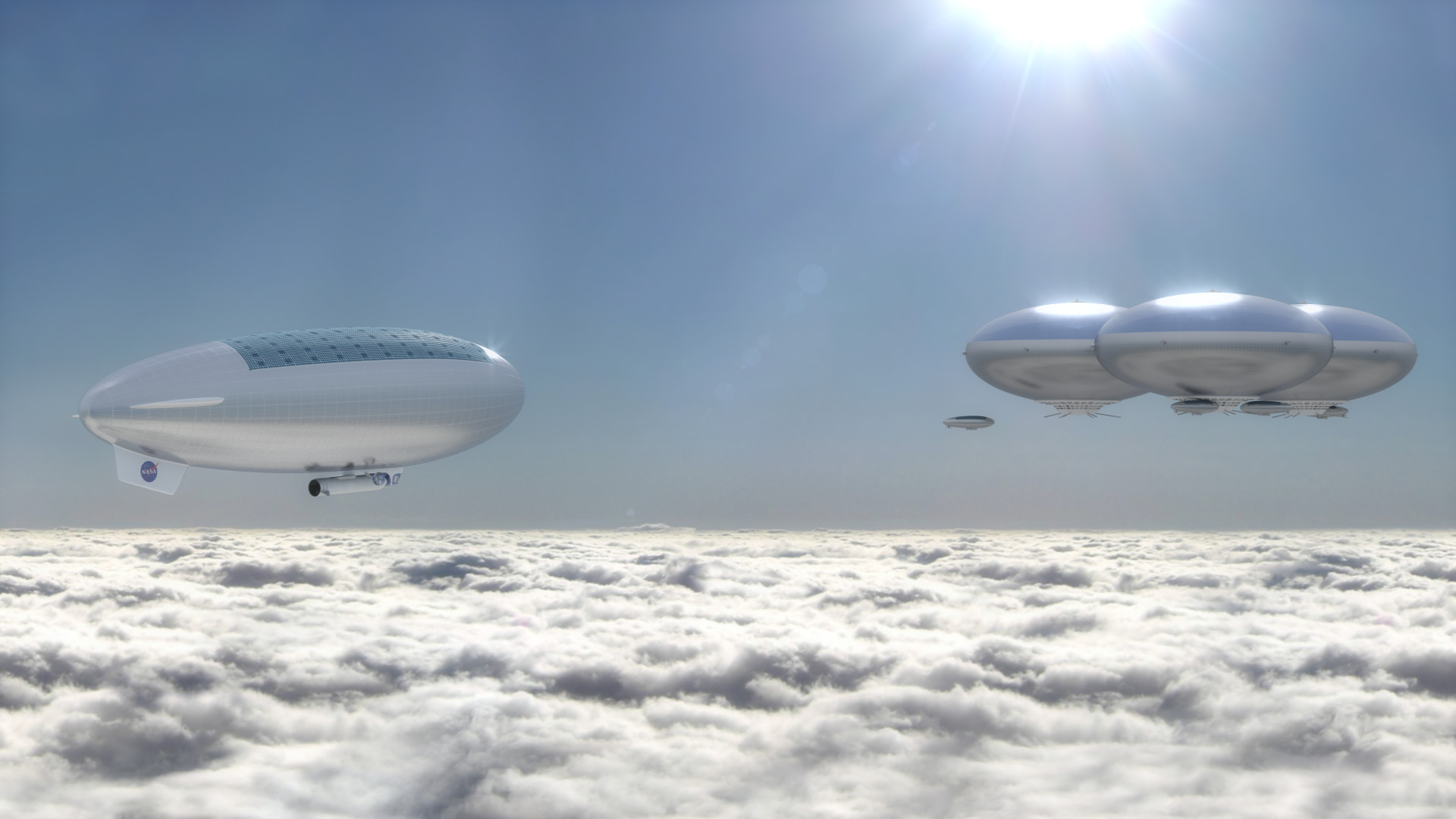
NASA concept for crewed floating outpost on Venus, 2014

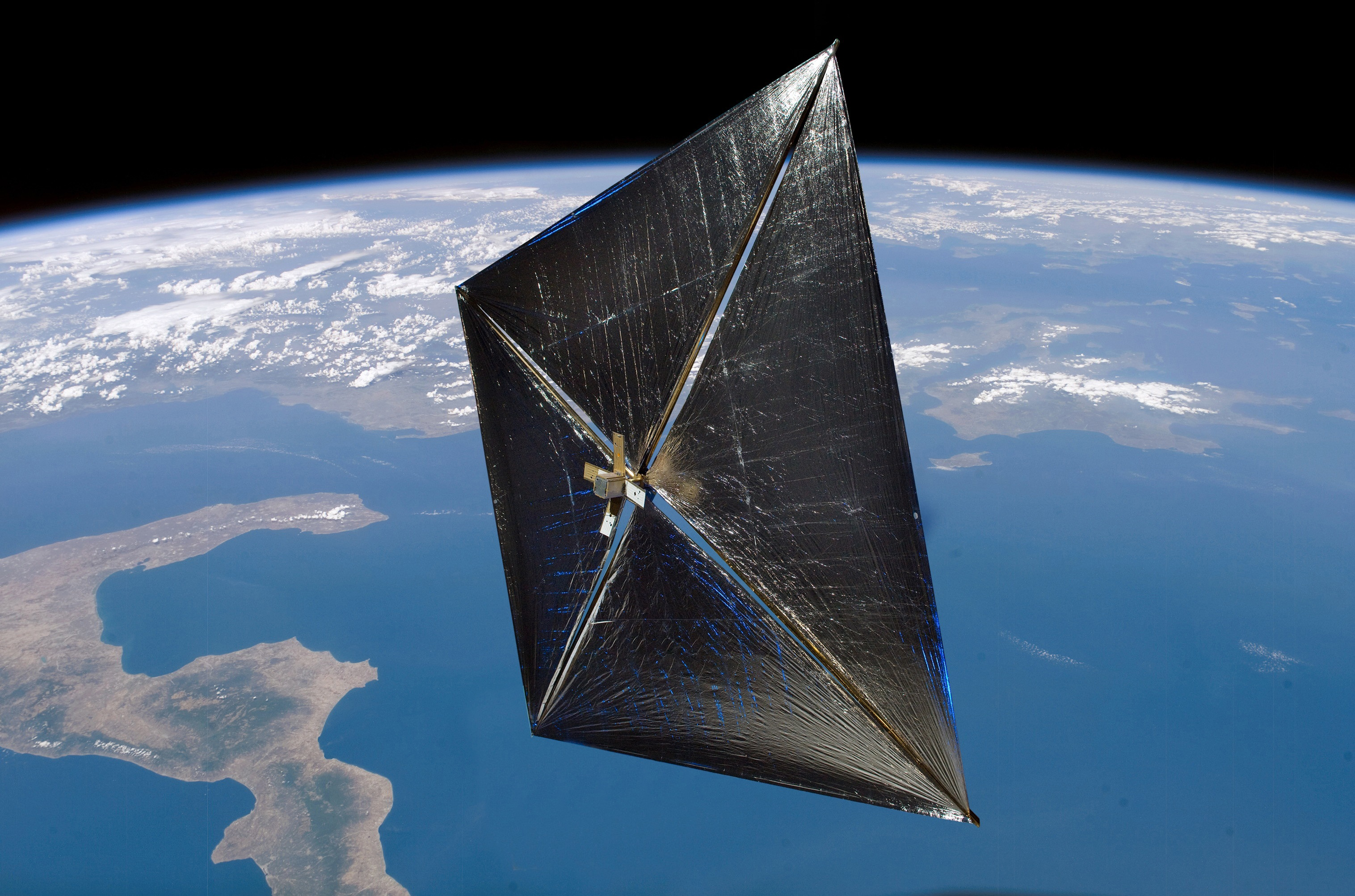
NASA concept for 2069 Alpha Centauri solar sail mission

== See also ==
- NASA people
- NASA Advanced Space Transportation Program
- NASA Art Program
- NASA Clean Air Study – 1989 study of plants removing air pollutants
- NASA Institute for Advanced Concepts – NASA program
- NASA Research Park – Research park near San Jose, California
- TechPort (NASA) – Technology Portfolio System

=== Lists ===
- List of crewed spacecraft
- List of NASA aircraft
- List of space disasters
- List of United States rockets
