= CSAM (disambiguation) =

CSAM often refers to child sexual abuse material, unlawful pornography exploiting minors.

CSAM may also refer to:

- California Society of Addiction Medicine, an organization of physicians who specialize in treating addiction
- Canadian Society of Addiction Medicine, an organization of physicians who specialize in treating addiction
- Code Scanning and Analysis Manager, a component of software-based virtualization for VirtualBox
- Cold spray additive manufacturing, a particular application of cold spraying
- Collections & Stories of American Muslims, a non-profit organization operating America's Islamic Heritage Museum
- College of Science and Mathematics, a school of Montclair State University
- Confocal scanning acoustic microscope, a type of acoustic microscope
- Cultural Stereotype Accuracy-Meaning Model, a model developed by psychologist Yueh-Ting Lee
- National Cyber Security Awareness Month, a computer security awareness campaign
