= Metallizing =

Technique of coating metal on the surface of objects

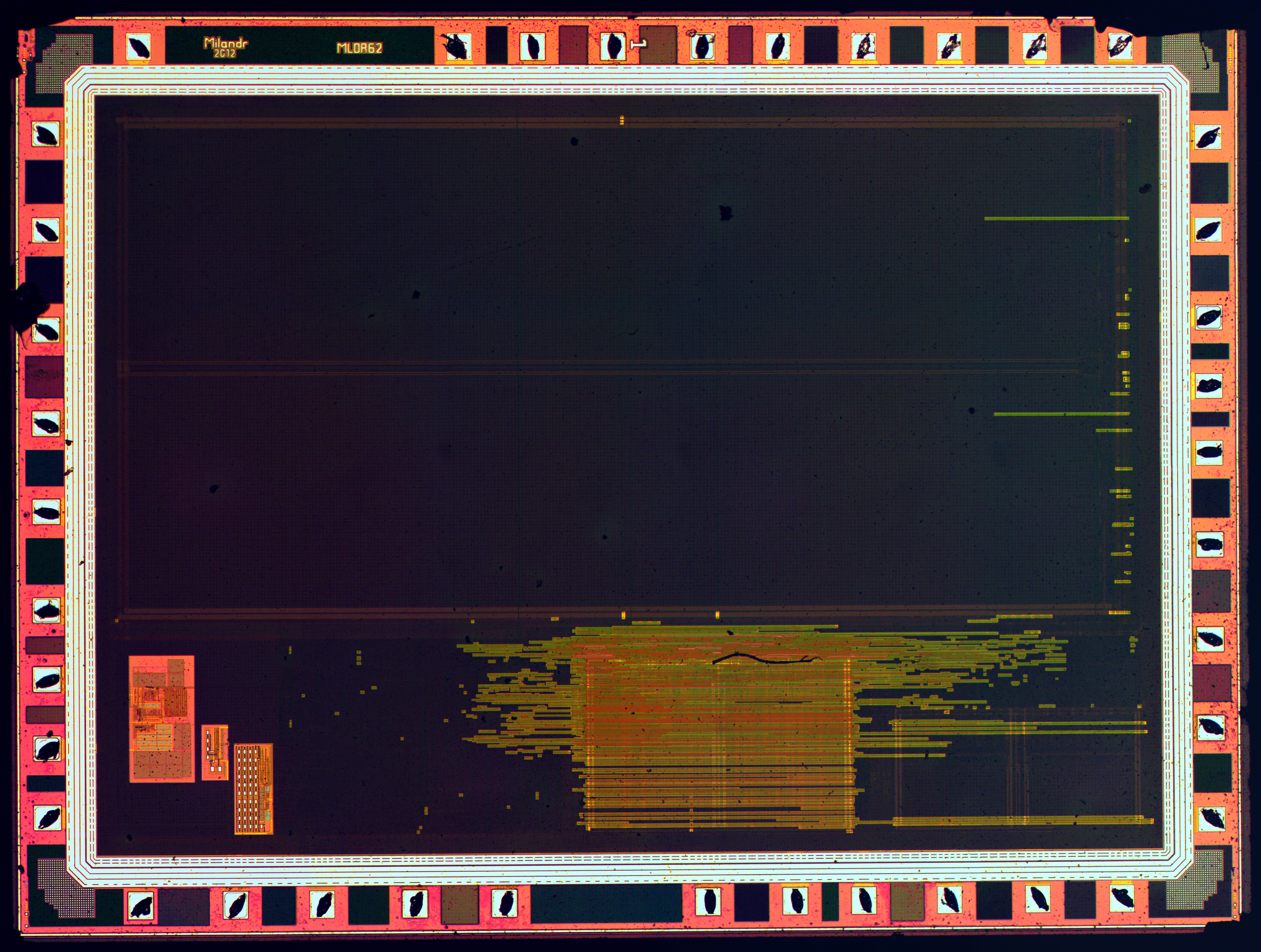
Radiation hardened die of the 1886VE10 microcontroller prior to metallization etching

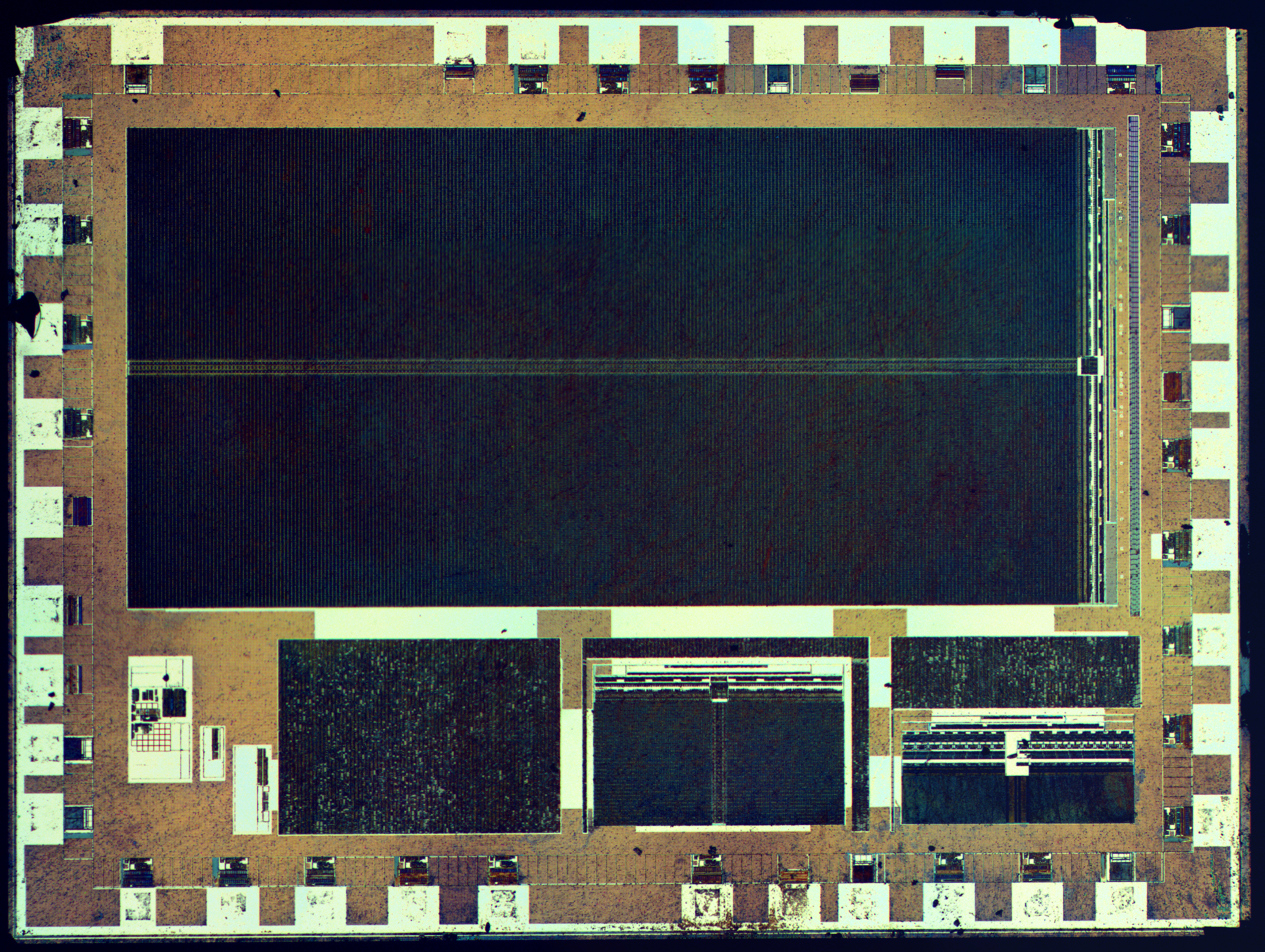
Radiation hardened die of the 1886VE10 microcontroller after a metallization etching process has been used

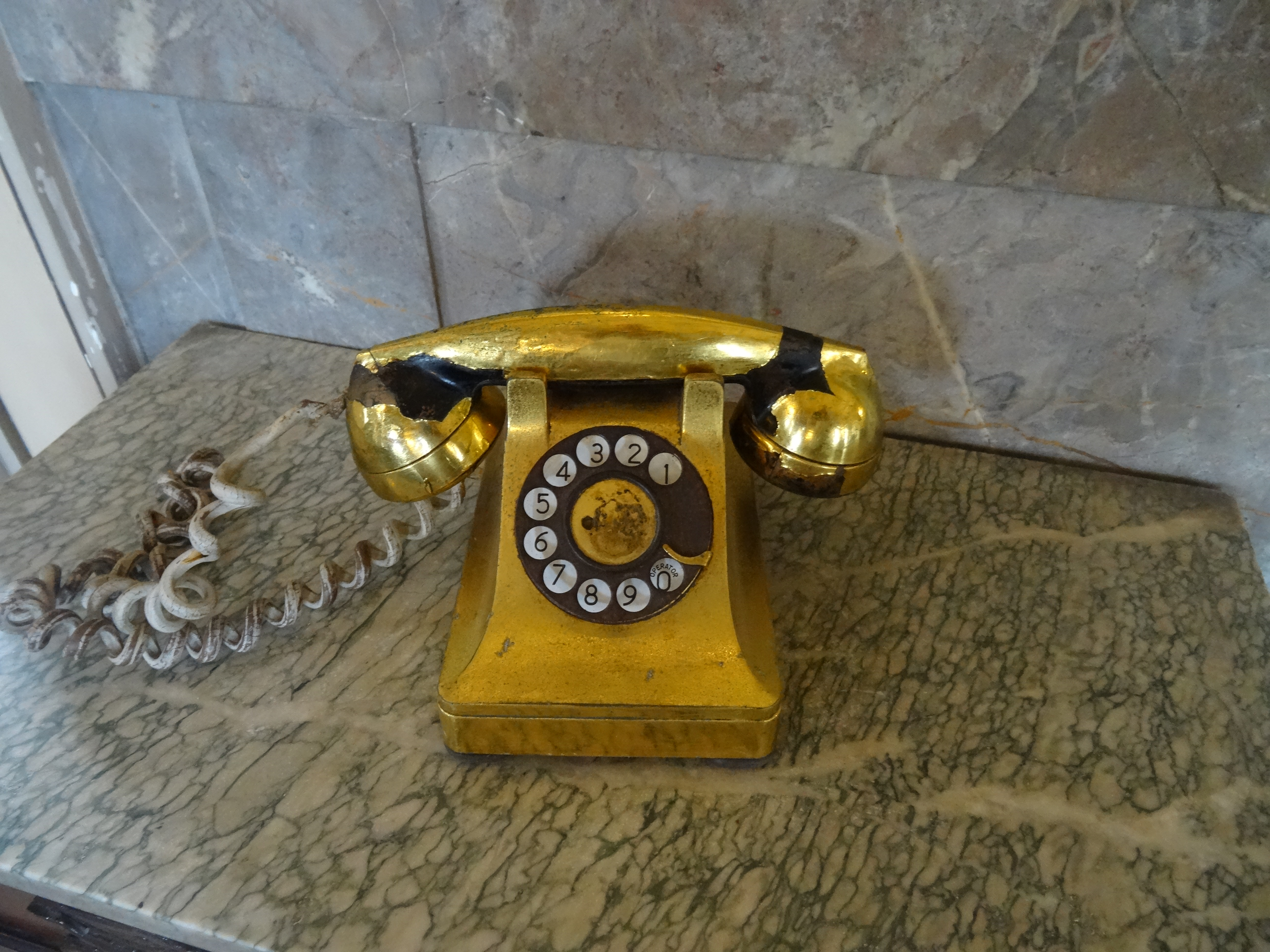
Gold-plated phone belonging to the dictator Batista at the Revolution Museum in Havana

Metallizing is the general name for the technique of coating metal on the surface of objects. Metallic coatings may be decorative, protective or functional.

== History ==
Techniques for metallization started as early as mirror making. In 1835, Justus von Liebig discovered the process of coating a glass surface with metallic silver, making the glass mirror one of the earliest items being metallized. Plating other non-metallic objects grew rapidly with introduction of ABS plastic. Because a non-metallic object tends to be a poor electrical conductor, the object's surface must be made conductive before plating can be performed. The plastic part is first etched chemically by a suitable process, such as dipping in a hot chromic acid-sulfuric acid mixture. The etched surface is sensitised and activated by first dipping in tin(II) chloride solution, then palladium chloride solution. The processed surface is then coated with electroless copper or nickel before further plating. This process gives useful (about 1 to 6 kgf/cm or 10 to 60 N/cm or 5 to 35 lbf/in) adhesion force, but is much weaker than actual metal-to-metal adhesion strength.

== Variants ==
The term "French bronze" was used in connection with cheap zinc statuettes and other articles, which were finished to resemble real bronze, and some older texts call the faux-bronze finish itself "French bronze". Its composition was typically 5 parts hematite powder to 8 parts lead oxide, formed into a paste with spirits of wine. Variations in tint could be obtained by varying the proportions. The preparation was applied to the article to be bronzed with a soft brush, then polished with a hard brush after it had dried.

=== Vacuum metallizing ===
Vacuum metallizing involves heating the coating metal to its boiling point in a vacuum chamber, then letting condensation deposit the metal on the substrate's surface. Resistance heating, electron beam, or plasma heating is used to vaporize the coating metal. Vacuum metallizing was used to deposit aluminum on the large glass mirrors of reflecting telescopes, such as with the Hale Telescope.

=== Thermal spray ===
Thermal spray processes are often referred to as metallizing. Metals applied in such a manner provide corrosion protection to steel for decades longer than paint alone. Zinc and aluminum are the most commonly used materials for metallizing steel structures.

Cold sprayable metal technology is a metallizing process that seamlessly applies cold sprayable or putty able metal to almost any surface. The composite metal consists of two (water-based binder) or three different ingredients: metal powder, binder and hardener. The mixture of the ingredients is cast or sprayed on the substrate at room temperature. The desired effect and the necessary final treatment define the thickness of the layer, which normally varies between 80 and 150 μm.

== See also ==
- List of telescope parts and construction
- Thin film deposition
- Electroplating
- Sputtering
- Chemical vapor deposition
- Electroless deposition
