= Cold spray =

Cold spray may refer to:

- Gas dynamic cold spray, or cold spraying, a powder coating deposition method
- Freeze spray, a type of aerosol spray used to rapidly cool surfaces in industrial and medical applications
- Cold electrospray ionization, a technique used in mass spectrometry to produce ions
