= Cold spray additive manufacturing =

Application of cold spraying to make parts

Cold spray additive manufacturing (CSAM) (also called cold spray 3D printing) is a particular application of cold spraying, able to fabricate freestanding parts or to build features on existing components. During the process, fine powder particles are accelerated in a high-velocity compressed gas stream, and upon the impact on a substrate or backing plate, deform and bond together creating a layer. Moving the nozzle over a substrate repeatedly, a deposit is building up layer-by-layer, to form a part or component. If an industrial robot or computer controlled manipulator controls the spray gun movements, complex shapes can be created. To achieve a 3D shape, there are two different approaches. First, to fix the substrate and move the cold spray gun/nozzle using a robotic arm; the second one is to move the substrate with a robotic arm, and keep the spray-gun nozzle fixed. There is also a possibility to combine these two approaches either using two robotic arms or other manipulators. The process always requires a substrate and uses only powder as raw material.

This technique is distinct from selective laser melting or electron-beam additive manufacturing or other additive manufacturing process using laser or electron beam for melting the feedstock materials.

== History ==
The origins of the cold spray process go back to the beginning of the 20th century, when it was developed and patented by Thurston. The process was further investigated by in the 1950s by Rocheville and was re-discovered in the 1980s at the Institute of Theoretical and Applied Mechanics of the Russian Academy of Science and developed as a coating technology. The process started to be employed for additive repair and fabrication of freeform structures, that can be considered as additive manufacturing, at the beginning of the 21st century, when the first commercial cold spray system was introduced in the market.

== Process ==
Additive manufacturing employing the process of cold spraying and its benefits can be considered as a deposition process, capable to build freeform parts and structures at high rates. Since it is a solid-state coating deposition process, during the process no melting of the feedstock material (metal powder) occurs, there are no heat related distortion and no protective atmosphere required, which enables to build up structures layer-by-layer. Theoretically, it allows for manufacture without size limitations for fabricating individual components or repairing damaged components.

The largest 3D printer or Additive Manufacturing machine utilizing cold spray can build parts up to 9×3×1.5 m. During the cold spray process, the impacting particles create the layer, whose thickness can differ, based on the spray gun travel speed against the substrate and the feedstock material feed rate, building the structure layer-by-layers.

== Materials ==
In cold spraying, the principle of the process is based on plastic deformation of the feedstock powder particles, therefore it is suitable to deposit with this technique mainly pure metals and alloys, but also metallic glasses, metal matrix composites and in some cases polymers. The research and development activities recently focusing on a few most challenging materials for the aircraft, space and defence industry such as aluminum alloys, nickel base superalloys, different steel grades and titanium alloys

== Applications ==
=== Space and aerospace applications ===
- Propellant tank additive manufacturing, exploiting the advantage of the process to deposit titanium and titanium alloys without melting the feedstock material.
- Thrust chambers, combustion chambers and rocket nozzles, where the process gives the benefit of unlimited dimensions and combination of different materials, which is also utilized to create the channels for conformal cooling of these components.
- The additive manufacturing repair developed for aircraft engine components is utilizing the solid state of the cold spray process, using 2 robotic arms and on-line 3D scanning to apply the deposit onto the complex geometry of a fan blade.
- The cold spray additive manufacturing process is also applied for additive repair of gearboxes and other aircraft components.

=== Tool and mould making ===
Forming, casting and stamping tools with conformal cooling and heating conducting elements, enabling shorter cycle times and significantly longer lifetime of these tools

=== Defence applications ===
Titanium drones. Titomic built a 1.8 meter quadcopter at their R&D Bureau in Melbourne, Australia using their version CSAM. The article also talks about Titomic being contracted to make test parts for Boeing.

=== Other applications ===
- Titanium tubes and other direct manufactured components
- Permanent magnets for electric motors, deposited directly to the motor housing using the cold spray additive manufacturing technique, leading to reduced cost and providing greater freedom in the design process

== Difference from other AM methods ==
The most significant differences between the cold spray additive manufacturing process and other additive manufacturing processes are the low temperature, solid state of the process, avoiding melting the feedstock material.

=== Benefits ===
- Very high deposition rates, up to 20 kg/h depending on the material density.
- No protective atmosphere required.
- Possibility to connect or combine dissimilar materials, such as metals with different melting point.
- Build-up dimensions limited only by the spray-gun and/or component manipulator.
- Capable to deposit almost all metals & alloys.
- The process has low energy consumption and produces no toxic waste.
- Possibility to collect and reuse 100% of particles (actual recovery rates unknown).
- Application of several powder feeders permits to perform separate injection of different materials in case of deposition of multicomponent deposits.

=== Drawbacks ===
- The process resolution is limited due to the "spray spot" size, which is usually of several millimeter.
- Due to the severe plastic deformation of the particles, residual stresses in the deposit can accumulate, leading to distortion, deformation or cracks.
- To reach the mechanical properties of the additive manufactured components, comparable to bulk material properties, post treatment of the component might be required.

== Equipment producers ==
- SPEE3D
- TITOMIC
- Centerline
- HERMLE AG
- Impact Innovations GmbH
- Inovati
- Plasma Giken
- VRC Metal Systems
- Powders on Demand
- BaltiCold Spray

== See also ==
3D printing
Electron-beam freeform fabrication
Selective laser sintering
Selective laser melting
