= Detonation spraying =

Method of thermal spraying

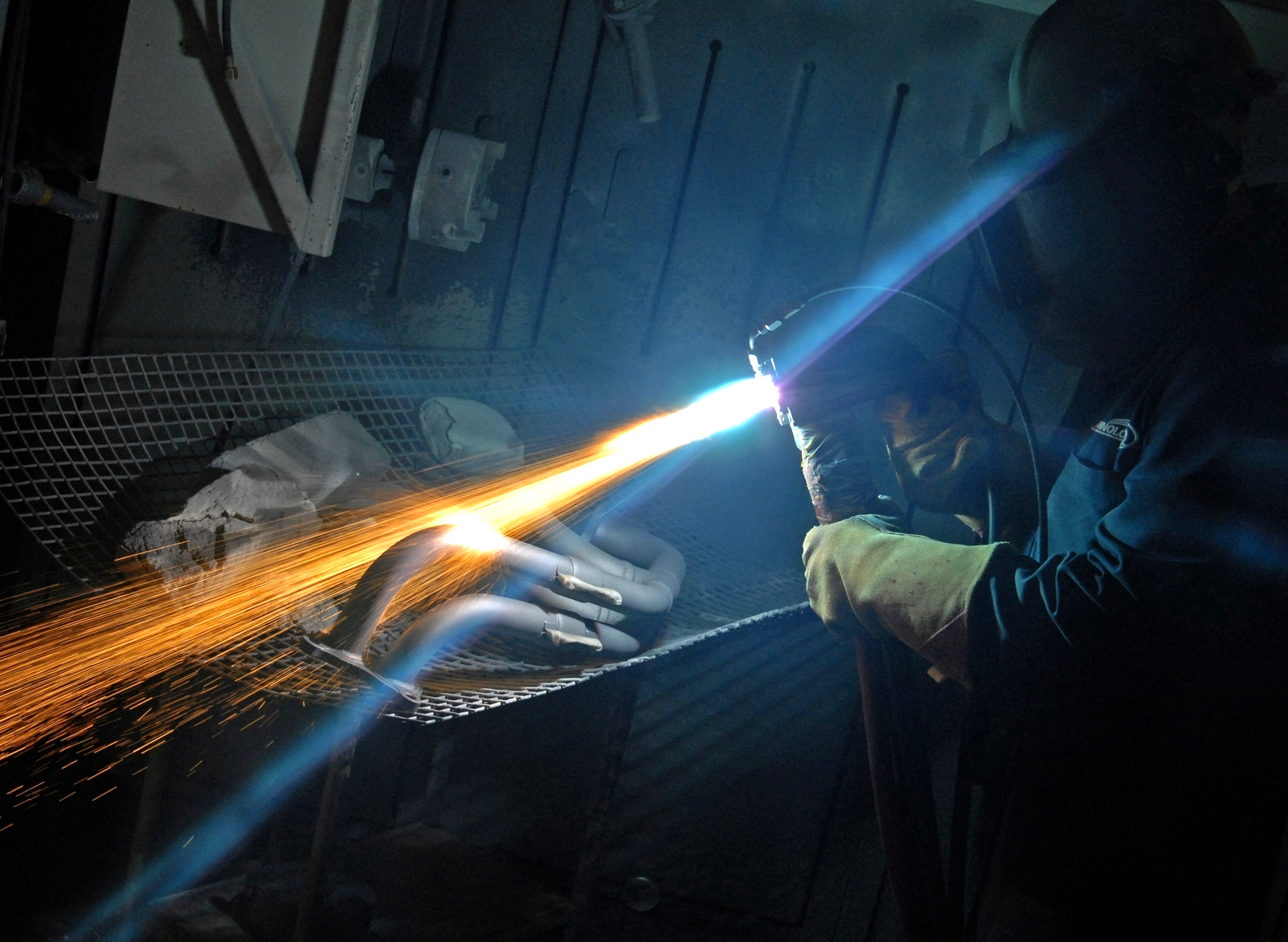
Plasma spraying: another thermal spraying technique similar to detonation spraying

Detonation spraying is one of the many forms of thermal spraying techniques that are used to apply a protective coating at supersonic velocities to a material in order to change its surface characteristics. This is primarily to improve the durability of a component. It was first invented in 1955 by H.B. Sargent, R.M. Poorman and H. Lamprey and is applied to a component using a specifically designed detonation gun (D-gun). The component being sprayed must be prepared correctly by removing all surface oils, greases, debris and roughing up the surface in order to achieve a strongly bonded detonation spray coating. This process involves the highest velocities (≈3500 m/s shockwave that propels the coating materials) and temperatures (≈4000 °C) of coating materials compared to all other forms of thermal spraying techniques. Because of these characteristics, detonation spraying is able to apply low porous (below 1%) and low oxygen content (between 0.1 and 0.5%) protective coatings that protect against corrosion, abrasion and adhesion under low load.

This process allows the application of very hard and dense surface coatings which are useful as wear resistant coatings. For this reason, detonation spraying is commonly used for protective coatings in aircraft engines, plug and ring gauges, cutting edges (skiving knives), tubular drills, rotor and stator blades, guide rails or any other metallic material that is subject to high wear and tear. Commonly the materials that are sprayed onto components during detonation spraying are powders of metals, metal alloys and cermets; as well as their oxides (aluminum, copper, iron, etc.).

Detonation spraying is an industrial process that can be dangerous if not performed correctly and in a safe environment. As such there are many safety precautions that must be adhered to when using this thermal spraying technique.

== History ==
The process of detonation spraying was first developed in 1955 by H.B. Sargent, R.M. Poorman and H. Lamprey and was subsequently patented. It was first made commercially available as the 'D-Gun Process' by Union Carbide in the same year. It was further developed in the 1960s by the Paton Institute in Kiev (Ukraine), into a technology that is still currently commercially available in the US by Demeton Technologies (West Babylon).

== D-Gun ==
Detonation spray coatings are applied using a detonation gun (D-gun) which is composed of a long-water-cooled metal barrel containing inlet valves for introducing gases and powders into the chamber. A preselected amount of the desired protective coating material known as feedstock (in powder form of particle size 5–60μm) is introduced into the chamber (at common powder flow rates of 16–40 g/min). Here oxygen and fuel (generally acetylene) are ignited by a spark plug to create a supersonic shock wave that propels the mixture of melted and/or partially-melted and/or solid feedstock (depending on the type of material used) out of the barrel and onto the subject being sprayed. The barrel is then cleared using a short burst of nitrogen before the D-gun is ready to be fired again. This is an important step because the heat from the residual gases can cause the new fuel mixture to combust which would in turn cause an uncontrollable reaction. Also a small amount of inert nitrogen gas inserted between the two mixtures of fuel and feedstock prior to firing, to help prevent backfiring. D-guns typically operate at firing rates of between 1–10 Hz. Many different mixtures of coating powders and D-gun settings can be used during detonation gun spraying of a material, all of which influence the final surface characteristics of the sprayed coating. Common powder materials used include but are not limited to: alumina-titania, alumina, tungsten carbide-tungsten-chromium carbide mixture with nickel-chromium alloy binder, chromium carbide, tungsten carbide with cobalt binder.

Metallurgists consider the measurements of surface oxygen content, macro and micro-hardness, porosity, bond strength and surface roughness when determining the quality of a thermally sprayed coating.

Properties Values Determining Quality of Spray Coatings for D-Gun Spraying
Thickness (μm)	Porosity (%)	Oxygen Content (%)	Hardness (VHN)	Bond Strength (psi)	Surface Roughness (μm)
75 - 125	0.25 -1	0.1 - 0.5	1350	10 000	3-6

=== Components ===
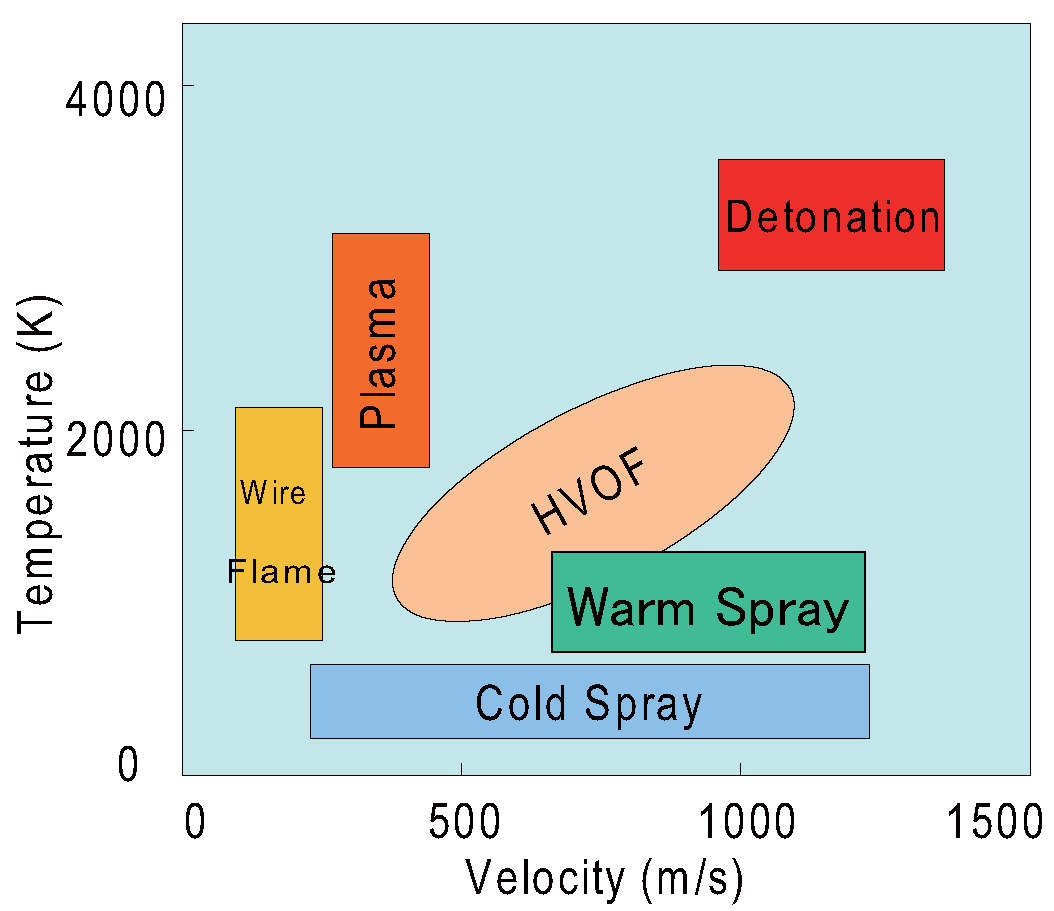
Velocities and temperatures for various thermal spraying techniques

- Spark plug
- Water cooled barrel
- Nitrogen inlet valve
- Fuel inlet valve
- Oxygen inlet valve
- Powder feedstock inlet valve

=== Cycle of operation overview ===
1. Mixture of fuel and oxygen is injected into the combustion chamber.
2. Powder feedstock is introduced into the chamber.
3. Nitrogen gas is added between the fuel-oxygen mixture and powder feedstock in order to prevent backfiring.
4. Mixture is ignited, and heated powder is ejected from the barrel onto the target material.
5. Barrel is then purged by nitrogen gas ready for firing again.
6. This process is repeated at a rate of between 1–10 Hz until desired thickness of coating is achieved.

== Surface Preparation ==
Detonation sprayed coatings are primarily mechanically bonded. This means that the surface of the component being sprayed, must be properly prepared so as to maximise the bond strength between the sprayed coating and the substrate. To successfully prepare the surface it must be cleaned of all greases, oils, dirt and other contaminants and sufficiently roughened to provide enough of a surface irregularity for the coating to cling to. Chemical processes are generally the most suitable methods used to clean the substrate surface. After which care must be taken not to touch and/or dirty the surface prior to spraying. The three methods used to roughen up the substrate surface are abrasive blasting, machining and bond coating. Cleaning occurs only after the roughening of the surface except for when a bond coating is used; the surface must be cleaned before and possibly after this process too. Application of the detonation spray coating should be performed as soon as possible after a substrates surface has been prepared.

=== Abrasive Blasting ===
Abrasive blasting also known as sandblasting, involves using compressed air to fire a steam of clean, sharp, crushed steel grit or aluminum oxide onto the surface of the component. Aluminum is a good option as it is relatively cheap. The fired grit breaks off small chucks of the substrate surface creating an evenly rough surface for good mechanical bonds to form. The substrate needs to be cleaned of any debris and residual grit from blasting prior to spraying.

=== Machining ===
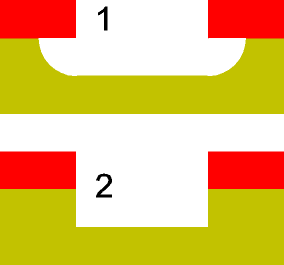
# An undercut into which a coating can be sprayed. # A indent with no undercuts.

For cases where a very strong mechanical bond is required (such as for components that are going to be used to machine with) the components surface is often machined to create grooves for the coating to bond to. Dovetail grooves offer strong positive bonding but can be laboursome and costly. A cheaper method is to cut simple partially open grooves, yet this method produces an inferior final bond strength. The edges and corners of a component present possible weak points in the coating structure, as they can break off from the component. To increase the bond strength at these points the corners and edges of the component should be rounded off. If the coating does not need to reach the edges of a component, then an undercut can be used (as shown in the diagram to the right) to secure the coating to the substrate. Undercuts can also be used in other scenarios.

Coatings often have a tendency to shrink after being applied due to the cooling process. This means steps need to be taken in order to minimise the negative effects of shrinking. If not, the coating can suffer from stress due to tension which will weaken the coating and in some cases may cause it to peel off. The fact coatings shrink can be used to increase the bond strength if applied wisely. Coating over the entire external surface of a component means that the coating will shrink around the component when cooled providing a sort of gripping force that will increase the mechanical bond strength. This is also the case if a flat component is sprayed over the edges, the coating will grip the surface like a clamp; again increasing bond strength. Internal coatings suffer from the effect of shrinking in that they will be pulled away from the surface of the component. To counter this the component can be heated to reduce the relative shrinking effects on cooling.

Components should be dry machined (without oils) to avoid oils being deposited on the component before spraying. If this is unavoidable then the substrate will need to be cleaned again prior to detonation spraying.

=== Bond Coating ===
After a surface has been abrasion blasted and/or machined a thin layer of molybdenum, nickel-chromium alloys or nickel aluminide can be sprayed before the final detonation spray coating to improve the bond strength. This is known as a bond coating. Bond coatings are often used when spray coating materials of ceramic composites are being applied. The component may need to be machined and/or abrasion blasted slightly deeper for the purpose of allowing space for the bond coating and spray coating to fit flush on the component surface.

Areas that are not to be sprayed must be covered in stop-off chemicals (chemicals that stop the spray from bonding) or tape. The chemicals and tape are then removed after the coating has cooled.

== Detonation Spray Coatings ==
Detonation spraying produces coatings of very high chemical bond strength and hardness. Coatings are of low porosity, oxygen content and have a low to medium surface roughness. This is achieved due to the extremely high temperatures and velocities produced by the detonation gun during surface coating application. These properties make detonation spraying the standard of comparison for all other thermal spray coatings (wire arc, plasma, flame, HVAF, HVOF, Warm, Cold).

There are many factors that determine the final detonation gun coating properties. Primarily, surface properties are determined by the type and properties of the powdered feedstock used (composition and particle size) but they are also affected by the settings used on the D-gun. These are powder flow rate, firing rate, distance from gun to target, how the D-gun is moved around to apply the coating, size of barrel, amount and composition of fuel and oxygen mixture.

Detonation spraying is able to apply protective coatings to relatively sensitive and delicate materials. This is due to the nature of the application of detonation gun coatings, being very quick and having the heat source removed from the target material. This allows for a large range of suitable applications for detonation spraying.

=== Types of Materials ===
Many materials are able to be sprayed as coatings using the D-gun. These materials used for the feedstock are powders of metals, alloys and cermets; as well as their oxides. However, mainly high-tech coatings are used, these include ceramics, and complex composites. Characteristics such as strength, hardness, shrink, corrosion resistance and wearing quality of possible spraying materials are factored into the decision of selecting a coating material.

Some examples include:

- Al_{2}O_{3}
- Cu–Al
- Cu–SiC
- Al–Al_{2}O_{3}
- Cu–Al_{2}O_{3}
- Al–SiC
- Al–Ti
- TiMo(CN)–36NiCo
- Fe–A

== Applications ==
The main functions of detonation spray coatings are to protect against corrosion (due to low oxygen content), abrasion and adhesion under low load. This means that detonation spraying produces hard durable coatings that are suitable for:

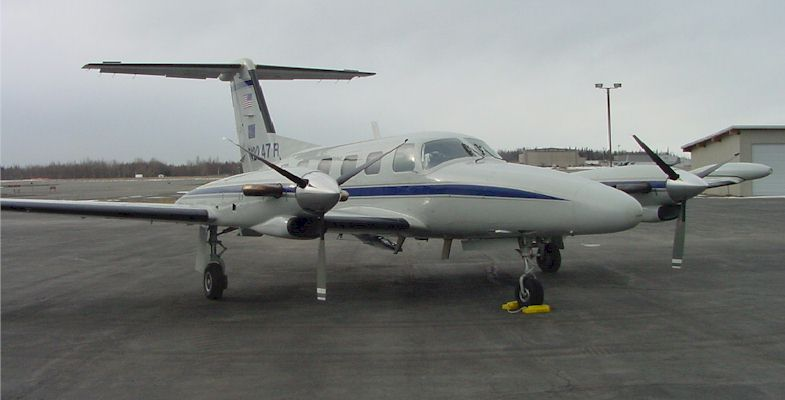
Detonation spraying is used on various components of modern aircraft

- Various components of general machinery: shafts, seals, bushings, bearings, seals
- Aviation:
  - rotor and stator blades
  - engine components
  - guide rails
- Oil and gas industry:
  - bushings and sealing rings of ESP units
  - gate valves
  - shut-off valves
  - working surface of drill tools
- Space rocket industry
- Electronic and radio industry
- Engineering of instruments
- Tools industry
  - Tubular drills
  - Skiving knives for rubber and plastic
- Shipbuilding industry
- D-gun plated plug and ring gauges

== Limitations ==
There are a few limitations of detonation spraying, these are:

- Detonation spraying creates a coating that is mostly mechanically bonded as opposed to being metallurgically bonded, which is a much stronger type of bond.
- Detonation spraying is a 'line of sight' process meaning that components generally need to be coated before being put to use or assembled. This is because the detonation gun needs to be able to access the surface to be able to apply an effective coating.
- The coatings despite being considerably strong in compression are weak under tension, meaning they can't be applied to malleable or expanding components.
- The coatings tend to fatigue under pinpoint loading.
- Detonation guns are quite large and loud.
- Detonation spraying has to be performed at a location specifically designed for it, as the gun is reasonable large and it is a loud process that produces substantial noise. For this reason, it is usually installed in a sound-proof room (with concrete walls 45 cm thick).
- The process involves a considerable amount of mechanisation and automation because the operator can't be in the room whilst the D-gun is in operation.

== Safety ==
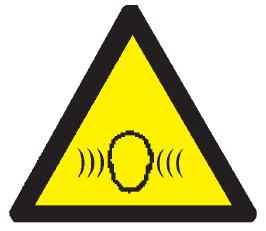

Detonation gun spraying like any other industrial process carries with it a number of safety hazards that need to be managed correctly in order to ensure operator safety whilst in use. These safety precautions primarily fall into the following categories and the hazard minimisation techniques suggested, in some cases have a positive effect on the resultant detonation spray coating. For example, having to automate the spraying process means that a very even and consistent spray coating can be achieved.

=== Noise ===
The operation of a detonation gun is a very loud process due to the multiple explosions occurring in the chamber per second. This could cause damage to operators hearing if in close proximity to the D-gun. As a result, detonation spraying should be performed within a sound proof room and no one should be present in the room during operation. Also operators should wear ear protection (such as ear muffs and/or ear plugs) while working with a D-gun.

=== Heat ===
Extremely high temperatures are reached by the D-gun (≈4000 °C) whilst in operation. Flammable and explosive fuels (generally acetylene) are used in detonation spraying to produce the supersonic shockwave that propels the powder coating materials onto their target components. This poses a serious burn and explosion hazard. Again, no-one should be present in the room whilst the D-gun is in operation and the room should be designed to withstand any malfunction of the D-gun. Also protective gloves should be used to handle the D-gun and sprayed components to avoid burns from hot components after spraying.

=== Dust and Fumes ===
The D-gun atomises the powder feedstock into extremely small particles (80–95% of particles by total number are of size <100 nm). This means proper extraction facilities are required for inhalation safety purposes. Also isolation of the D-gun is recommended to avoid operators breathing in the dangerous dust and fumes. If operators are to enter the room they should wear appropriate dust masks or respirators. Many of the compounds used as the feedstock in detonation spraying are detrimental to human health if ingested or inhaled. Airborne metals from the detonation gun in particular are harmful to the lungs. Exposure to cadmium for example can cause harm to the kidneys and lungs, vomiting, loss of consciousness and even reduced fertility. Also heavy metals have been shown in recent studies to be carcinogenic such as lead, nickel, chromium, and cadmium. Some serious lung conditions caused by metal dust inhalation include:

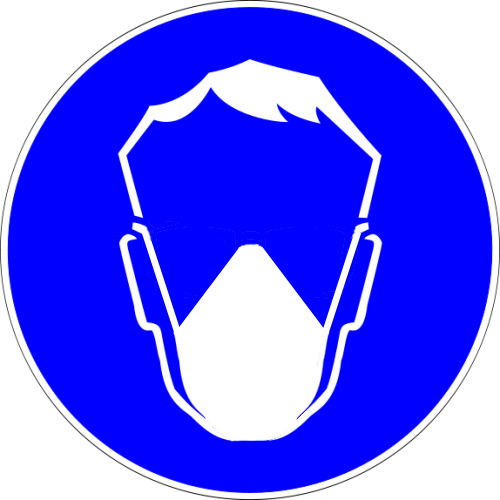

- Silicosis - a lung disease cause by inhaling silica present in the feedstock compounds.
- Siderosis - (silver polisher's lung or welder's lung), a lung disease cause by inhaling iron present in the feedstock compounds.
- Alzheimer's - a memory loss disease more common among the elderly has been shown by some studies to be caused by high levels of exposure to aluminum (among many other causes). However, these studies were not conclusive, and others have proven otherwise.
- Metal fume fever - this can occur in some individuals following exposure certain metal compounds (such as copper, zinc, magnesium and aluminum alloys or oxides) that have a particularly unpleasant odour. The fumes are caused as a byproduct when the metals are heated and can trigger a fever-like reaction that may need medical attention.
