= Solution precursor plasma spray =

Thermal spray process

Solution precursor plasma spray (SPPS) is a thermal spray process where a feedstock solution is heated and then deposited onto a substrate. Basic properties of the process are fundamentally similar to other plasma spraying processes. However, instead of injecting a powder into the plasma plume, a liquid precursor is used. The benefits of utilizing the SPPS process include the ability to create unique nanometer sized microstructures without the injection feed problems normally associated with powder systems and flexible, rapid exploration of novel precursor compositions.

== Background ==
The use of a solution precursor was first reported as a coating technology by Karthikeyan et al. In that work, Karthikeyan showed that the use of a solution precursor was in fact feasible; however, well adhered coatings could not be generated. Further work was reported in 2001, which refined the process to produce thermal barrier coatings, YAG films, and silicon ceramic coatings. Since then, extensive research on the technology has been explored in large part by the University of Connecticut and Inframat Corporation.

== Process ==
The precursor solution is formulated by dissolving salts (commonly zirconium and yttrium when used to formulate thermal barrier coatings) in a solvent. Once dissolved, the solution is then injected via a pressurized feed system. As with other thermal spray processes, feedstock material is melted and then deposited onto a substrate. Typically, the SPPS process sees material injected into a plasma plume or high velocity oxygen fuel (HVOF) combustion flame. Once the solution is injected, the droplets go through several chemical and physical changes and can arrive at the substrate in several different states, from fully melted to unpyrolized. The deposition state can be manipulated through spray parameters and can be used to significantly control coating properties, such as density and strength.

== Thermal barrier coatings ==
Most current research on SPPS has examined is application to create thermal barrier coatings (TBCs). These complex ceramic/metallic material systems are used to protect components in hot sections of gas turbine and diesel engines. The SPPS process lends itself particularly well to the creation of these TBCs. Studies report the generation of coatings demonstrating superior durability and mechanical properties. Superior durability is imparted by the creation of controlled through thickness vertical cracks. These cracks only slightly increase coating conductivity while allowing for strain relief of stress generated by the CTE mismatch between the coating and the substrate during cyclic heating. The generation of these through thickness cracks was systematically explored and found to be caused by the depositing a controlled portion of unpyrolized material in the coating. Superior mechanical properties such as bond strength and in-plane toughness result from the nanometer sized microstructure that are created by the SPPS process.

Other studies have shown that engineered coatings can reduce thermal conductivity to some of the lowest reported values for TBCs. These low thermal conductivities were achieved through the generation of an alternating high-porosity, low-porosity microstructure or the synthesis of a low-conductivity precursor composition with rare-earth dopants.

== Costs ==
The SPPS process is adapted to existing thermal spray systems. Application costs are significantly less than EB-PVD coatings and slightly higher than Air Plasma Spray coatings.
