= Suspension plasma spray =

In materials engineering, suspension plasma spray (SPS) is a form of plasma spraying where the ceramic feedstock is dispersed in a liquid suspension before being injected into the plasma jet.

By suspending powder in a fluid, normal feeding problems are circumvented, allowing the deposition of finer microstructures through the use of finer powders.
