= Conformal cooling channel =

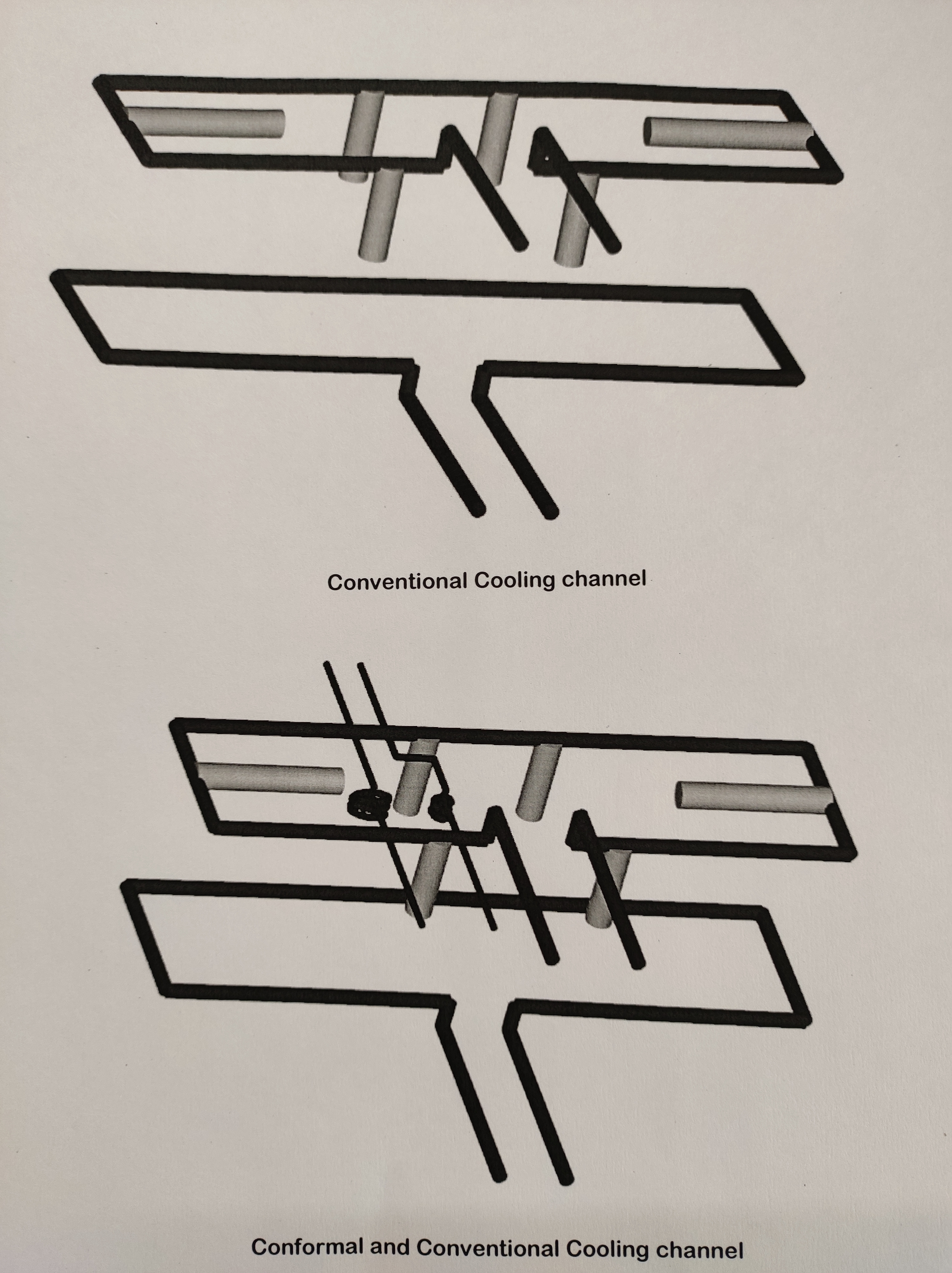
- Basic concept diagram of conformal and conventional cooling channels
- Process type: Injection moulding process

Conformal cooling channel is a cooling passageway which follows the shape or profile of the mould core or cavity to perform rapid uniform cooling process for injection moulding or blow moulding processes.

== The conformal cooling technology ==
Conformal cooling is a technology utilized in the plastic injection molding industry to improve the efficiency and quality of molded parts. Traditional cooling channels in molds are typically straight and uniform, leading to uneven cooling and thus, longer cycle times and potential defects in the finished product.

Conformal cooling, on the other hand, involves the creation of cooling channels that conform precisely to the shape of the part being produced. These channels are strategically designed to follow the contours of the mold, ensuring uniform cooling and reducing cycle times significantly. This results in faster production rates, improved part quality, reduced energy consumption, and increased tooling lifespan.

By optimizing the cooling process, conformal cooling technology enables manufacturers to produce complex, high-precision parts with greater efficiency and consistency. This innovative approach has revolutionized the plastic injection molding industry, offering numerous benefits to manufacturers seeking to enhance their competitiveness in the market.

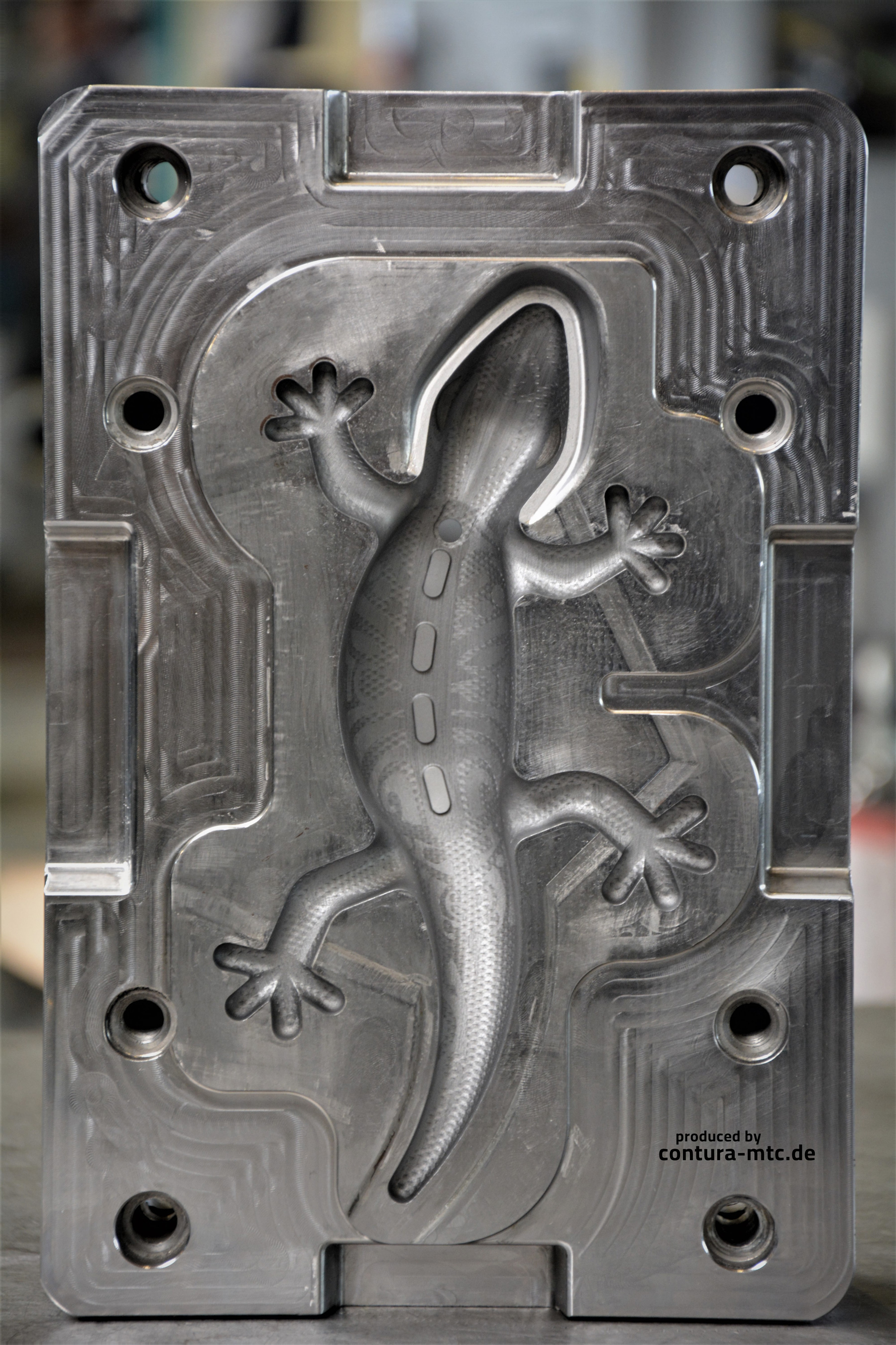
Finished injection conformal cooling moulding tool

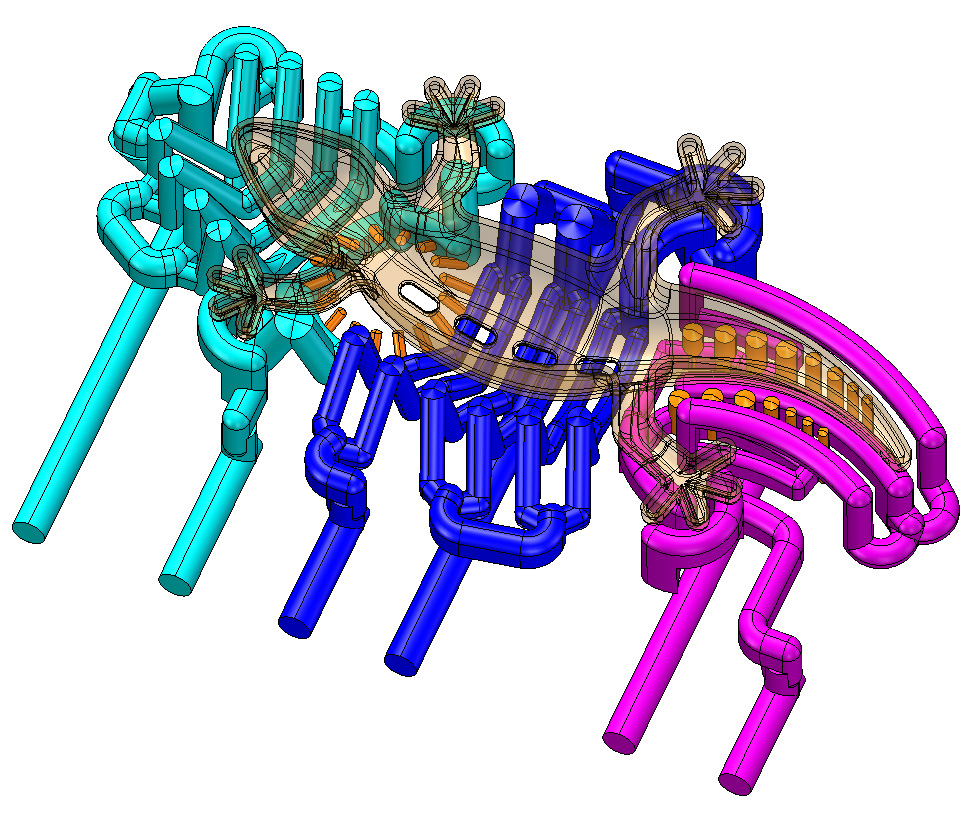
Contour-following temperature control segmented

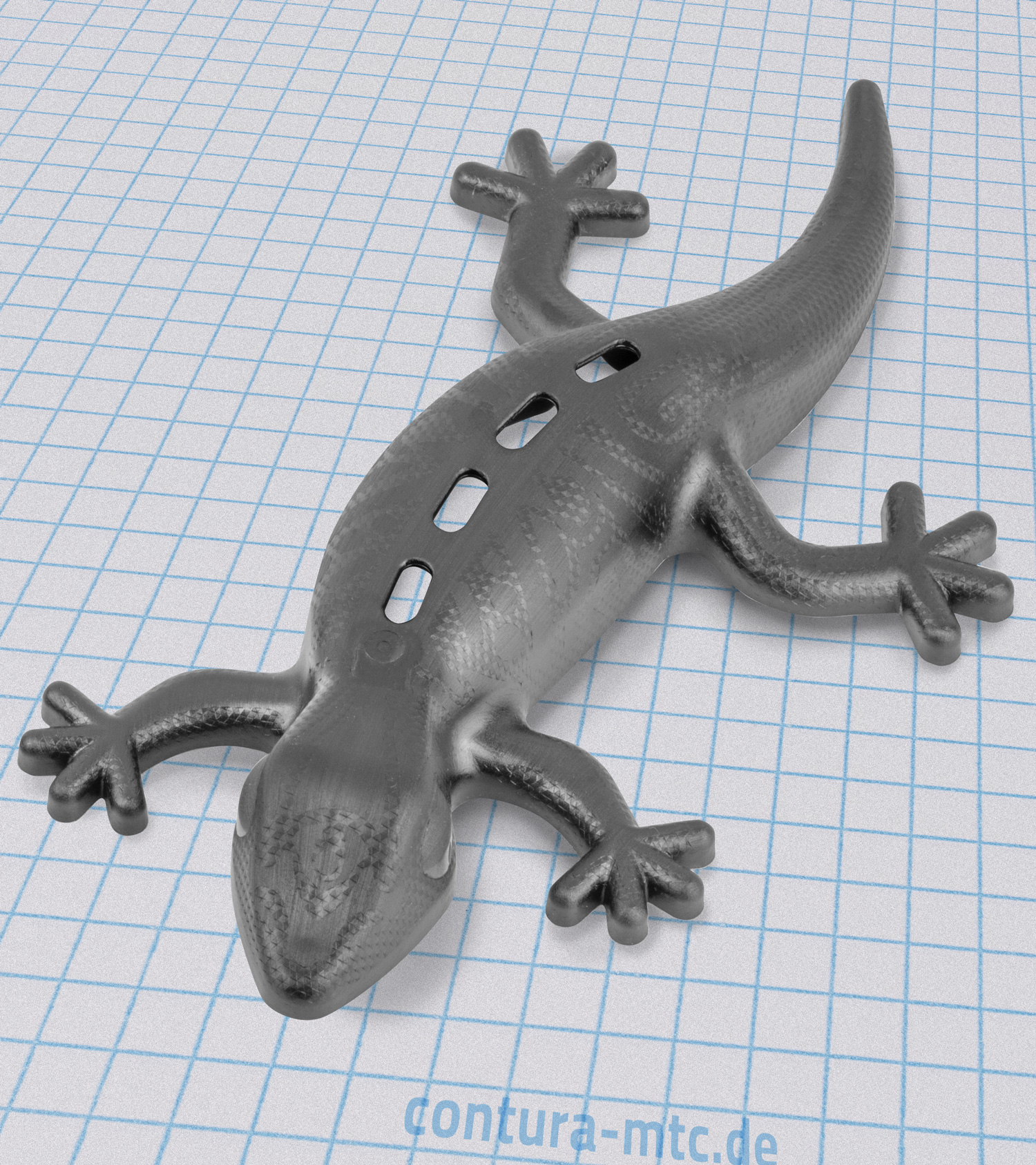
structured surfaces on a plastic part

== Process overview of conformal cooling in the plastic injection industry ==
Design Stage

The process begins with the design of the mold, which includes the creation of the cavity and core that define the shape of the plastic part to be produced. During the design stage, engineers identify areas of the mold where heat tends to accumulate and impact the quality of the molded part.

Cooling Channel Design

Engineers design cooling channels that closely follow the contours of the mold cavity and core. These channels are strategically placed to ensure uniform cooling across the entire surface of the mold, thereby minimizing warpage, reducing cycle times, and improving part quality.

Manufacturing

Cooling channels can be integrated into the mold using traditional machining processes and additive manufacturing techniques such as 3D printing.

Optimization

Computational fluid dynamics (CFD) simulations are often used to optimize the design of cooling channels. These simulations help engineers predict and analyze the flow of coolant through the channels, identify potential hot spots, and refine the design to achieve optimal cooling efficiency.

Manufacturing

Once the design is finalized, the mold is manufactured using the chosen production method, whether it be additive manufacturing or traditional machining. Cooling channels are integrated into the mold according to the designed specifications.

Coolant Circulation

During the injection molding process, a coolant (typically water) is circulated through the cooling channels to absorb heat from the mold. The coolant removes heat from the mold, allowing the plastic material to solidify and cool more rapidly.

Benefits

By minimizing cooling time, manufacturers can increase throughput and reduce energy consumption, resulting in cost savings and improved competitiveness. Conformal cooling is a sophisticated technique that optimizes the cooling process in plastic injection molding by integrating cooling channels that conform to the shape of the molded part. Through careful design, simulation, and optimization, conformal cooling enables manufacturers to achieve faster cycle times, higher part quality, and increased efficiency in production.

== History and the patent ==
The process was developed in 1999 by Klaus Schmetz - USA patent number 5,855,933. The company applying for the patent was "Innova", based in Germany. This became the company "CONTURA Mold Temperature Control GmbH" in 2003.
