= Yueh-Ting Lee =

Dr. Yueh-Ting Lee
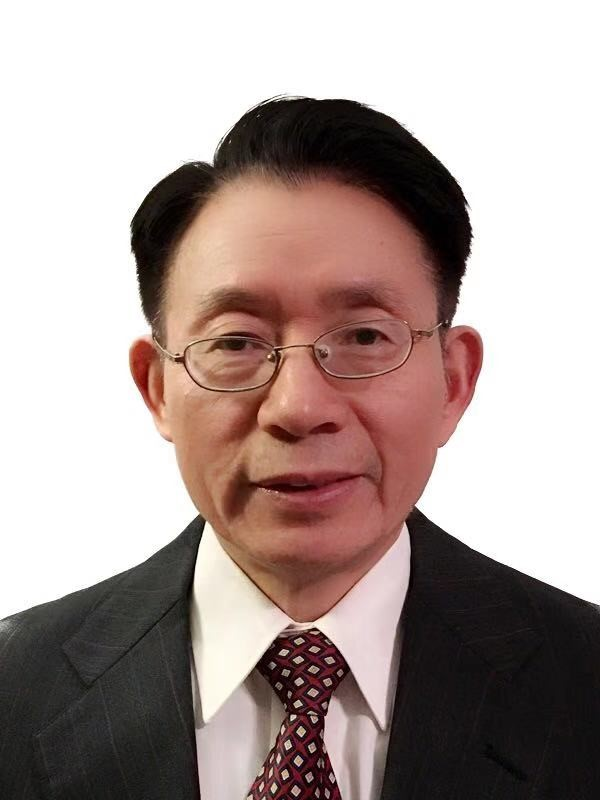
- Education: University of Pennsylvania
- Occupations: Professor, Psychologist, Administrator
- Employer: North Dakota State University

Dr. Yueh-Ting Lee (Chinese: 黎岳庭, pronounced as “you-ting” or “your-ting” Lee, aka “Li Yue-ting”) is a social and evolutionary psychologist and an administrator at North Dakota State University.

== Life and Career ==
Yueh-Ting Lee (also known as Y-T Lee) received his Ph.D. from State University of New York at Stony Brook or Stony Brook University. He is an immigrant from China and he is a social and evolutionary psychologist who has taught a variety of courses at various institutions since 1990. Dr. Lee's academic lineage traces back to Kurt Lewin and Leon Festinger through Dana Bramel at Stony Brook University and Albert Pepitone at the University of Pennsylvania with whom Dr. Lee studied. Earlier in his career, Dr. Lee also held key administrative positions such as Department Chair and Professor at Minnesota State University, Mankato; Dean of the College of Arts and Sciences at Minot State University in North Dakota; and Dean and Professor of the College of Arts and Sciences and Associate Vice President at the University of Toledo in Ohio. He served as dean of the Graduate School at Southern Illinois University Carbondale (2015-2019). From 2020 through June 2025, he continued to provide academic leadership at SIU, including serving three terms as Faculty Senate President, representing approximately 1,500 faculty members (https://facultysenate.siu.edu/membership/past-presidents.php) when he was Applied Psychology Director and Professor of the School of Psychological and Behavioral Sciences at the University. Dr. Lee is Dean and Professor of the College of Graduate and Interdisciplinary Studies at North Dakota State University (https://www.ndsu.edu/graduate-school/about/leadership-and-staff).

== Research ==
Dr. Lee's research has centered on categorical knowledge, cultural stereotypes, stereotype accuracy, human beliefs and evolutionary psychology, and personality psychology since early 1990s. His research has dealt with the accuracy and validity in human categorical perceptions and judgments, including cultural stereotypes and stereotyping.

Dr. Lee's work has addressed various ethnic and cultural identity conflicts and justice for years, both in the US and around the world with a focus on victimized or disadvantaged groups.

Dr. Lee's recent research include Daoism, evolution, human beliefs and meanings. Dr. Lee and Dr. Holt produced a volume entitled Dao and Daoist Ideas for Scientists, Humanists and Practitioners - which addresses that Daoism not only as a philosophy or religion but also as a practical way of life related to all aspects of human beings and the natural environment.

He has conducted field research on American Indian beliefs and ancient East Asian beliefs (e.g., totemic psychology, shamanic psychology) for approximately 15 years both by working with Ojibwa (in MI, MN and ND), Dakota, Lakotas, Nakota, Hidatsa, Arikara and Mandan (in ND and SD), Native Alaskan tribes, and other tribes in Americas and by working with various ethnic groups in China and other parts of Asia.

== EPA Model (Evaluation, Potency, Accuracy) ==
Dr. Lee and his colleagues have developed an Evaluation-Potency-Accuracy (EPA) model of stereotypes in which the model explains stereotypes and categorical knowledge with three dimensional components. "E" represents evaluation or valence (e.g., stereotypes and human categories can range from positive to negative). "P" represents potency or latency of activation from the memory of human knowledge (e.g., stereotypes or human categories can range from automatic activation to little or no activation). Finally, "A" represents accuracy (e.g., stereotypes and human categories can range from accurate to inaccurate). According to the model, Evaluation (positive-negative), potential (active-inactive), and accuracy (accurate-inaccurate) are not dichotomous but continuous variables.

The dimensions in Lee et al.'s (1995; 2013) EPA model of stereotypes are different from the three dimensions proposed in Osgood et al.'s Semantic Differential model (1957). Osgood et al.'s (1957) model had Evaluation (e.g., positive-negative; good-bad; true-false), Potency (e.g., hard-soft; strong-weak; heavy-light) and Activity (e.g., active-passive; fast-slow; hot-cold). Lee et al.'s (1995; 2013) perceived the potency and the activity components as conceptually similar, so rather than having both potency and activity, they (Lee et al., 1995; 2013) included accuracy as the third dimension of stereotypes.

In this work Lee (2011) also highlights that the paradox of stereotypes and diversity is that we demonize stereotypes while celebrating diversity. Stereotyping involves ascribing traits or behaviors to a social group or category, while diversity recognizes and appreciates traits or behaviors endemic to a particular group of people. Dr. Lee notes that research and public perception regards stereotypes as having negative content that is inaccurate. While this may be true sometimes, stereotypes can be positive or negative, accurate or inaccurate. Lee's work on stereotype accuracy has helped to uncover information on the largely ignored spectrum of stereotypes that are positive and accurate as well as those that are negative and accurate. This work has also examined the trouble of stereotype inaccuracy.

Stereotypes are meant to be used as cognitive heuristics which have the most utility in the absence of information. Stereotypes are overridden when individuating information is obtained. For example, you would not stereotype a close friend because you have much more individualized knowledge of their traits and behaviors. This highlights the Bayesian manner in which we use stereotypes. Further when reality changes, human perceptions and stereotypes may also change.

Dr. Lee's research concerning stereotype accuracy looks at the importance of studying stereotype accuracy and inaccuracy. His research is aimed towards those interested in understanding the issues of culture, race, class, and gender.

== The Cultural Stereotype Accuracy-Meaning Model (CSAM) ==
The Cultural Stereotype Accuracy-Meaning Model (CSAM, Lee & Duenas, 1995) suggests the level of accuracy in stereotypes is based on the culturally bonded interpretation of stereotypic beliefs of a stereotyped culture. Specifically, if the two people's evaluation of a single act or behavior is depended on the personal interpretation of a particular act, then it is possible that a correlation, in an other words accuracy, could be found in cross-cultural perceptions of that same act or behavior. To illustrate using the bath routine in rural China and the United States, Americans may perceive the rural Chinese's habit to only shower once a month in winter as dirty; the rural Chinese may interpret Americans’ habit of showering everyday as “shower-addicted.” Stereotype accuracy is relative rather than absolute. People may judge themselves and others using the shared beliefs and standards of their own cultural group. Moreover, the accuracy of cross-cultural perception could be restricted and varied due to time and spatial. Finally, stereotype accuracy requires mutual understanding of culturally specific interpretations.

== Taoist (or Daoist) Big Five and Water-like (W-L) Leadership/Personality ==
Dr. Lee's Daoist (Taoist) Big-Five model has been studied both in China and in the USA, and can be applied to social, counseling/clinical, and industrial/organizational psychology. "Daoism is a way of life and human existence in relation to the universe rather than simply an ethical or religious way of behaving". Daoism places an emphasis on a naturalistic way of life that is harmony with both nature and fellow man.

The Daoist Big Five is based on the philosophy of Laozi (or Lao Tsu) and uses water to represent five distinct areas that affect leadership and personality (e.g., altruism, modesty, flexibility, honesty, and perseverance). According to Dr. Lee, “the best is like water” (上善若水), which is one of the Taoistic (or Daoistic) quotations from Lao Tsu in ancient China. For example, water can be altruistic and serve all things in its quality. The lesson is that human beings could learn from water to be altruistic and serve others without the expectation of reward.

The first component of the Daoist Big Five is altruism. Altruism does not require self-sacrifice but sacrifice, such as time or energy, is shown to be of greater significance. Second, water can be said to be modest since naturally water always goes to the lowest position. Instead of competing for a high position, water yields by moving to a position below others. Again, one can learn from water to be humble and modest. Third, water can be described as adaptable and flexible as it matches the shape of any container. Water can not be broken and is able to adjust to pressure and work around it. The lesson, according to Lee, is to be flexible and adaptable to different people in different situations. Fourth, water can be very clear and transparent. Being clear shows others that you are trustworthy, as you have nothing to hide. Gentle and persistent force will complete the task overtime, rather than forcing a task and creating more problems. In other words, human beings should be honest and transparent with others. Finally, water can be very soft and gentle (making it difficult to catch) but also strong and persistent (even the hardest rock will yield to continuous drips of water).

Dr. Lee suggests that it is good to be soft, gentle, and friendly with others but also forthright and persistent with them. Perhaps water is our best teacher, not only for a leader but also for any individual. In fact recent research supported this perspective.

== Evolutionary Psychology and Human Beliefs: The Two-System Model ==
The Darwin-God dilemma is the disagreement between science and religion which is pitted against one another(i.e., radical evolutionary scientists against radical creationists). Lee and team (Lee et al., 2019, 2020) proposed the two-system model as a common foundation which serves as a bridge between the two camps (i.e., radical evolutionary scientists against radical creationists. More specifically, System 1 comprises the biological evolution of human and other species, which has occurred via natural selection for millions of years (i.e., Darwinian evolutionary theory). System 2 encompasses the evolution of human belief systems. These belief systems have developed and evolved via nature and totemic worship as our ancestors attempted to understand and interpret the natural world (i.e., finding the meaning of life or human existence). Totemism generates Shamanism which produces Daoism, Confucianism, Hinduism, Buddhism, Judaism (which Christianity, Catholicism and Islamic religion). This two-system model, which is based on nature, provides an approach and common ground for bridging science-religion and radical evolutionary scientists (Darwinists) versus radical creationists (e.g., Christian Fundamentalists).

== Selected publications ==
- 1997 Are Americans more optimistic than the Chinese?
- 1999 Personality and person perception across cultures
- 2004 The Psychology of Ethnic and Cultural Conflict
- 2007 How did Asian Americans Respond to Negative Stereotypes and Hate Crimes?
- 2008 Daoist leadership: Theory and application
- 2008 Leadership & management in China: Philosophies, theories and practices
- 2010 Back in the real world
- 2011 Social psychology of stereotyping and human difference appreciation
- 2013 Examining Daoist big-five leadership in cross-cultural and gender perspective
- 2013 Stereotypes as valid categories of knowledge and human perceptions of group differences

== Recent publications ==
Journal Articles

Kanazawa, S. & Lee, Y-T (2020). What is the next big question in Evolutionary Psychology? An introduction to the special issue. Evolutionary Behavioral Sciences, 14(4), 299–301.

Lee, Y-T., Jamnik, M. Maedge, K., & Chen, W-T (2020). The Darwin-God dilemma: A totemic approach to the meaning of life and human existence. Evolutionary Behavioral Sciences, 14(4), 355–361.

Pertiwi Y.G., Geers A.L., & Lee Y.-T. (2020) Rethinking intergroup contact across cultures: Predicting outgroup evaluations using different types of contact, group status, and perceived sociopolitical contexts. Journal of Pacific Rim Psychology, 14(16), 1–13. https://doi.org/10.1017prp.2020.9

Chan, S., & Lee, Y-T. (2020). An experimental investigation of Chinese and American perceptions: Evaluation, potency and accuracy of cross-cultural stereotypes. American Review of China Studies, 21(1), 1-22.

Zhao, Y, Zhao, Y, Lee, Y-T, & Chen, L. (2020). Cumulative interpersonal relationship risk and resilience models for bullying victimization and depression in adolescents. Personality and Individual Differences. 155.

Zhao, Y., Zhao, Y, & Lee, Y-T (2019). Selection and multiple analysis of assessment instruments of students’ bully behavior at schools. Journal of Southwest University (Social Science Edition in Chinese and in English), 45(4), 118–124.

Zhao, Y., Lee, Y-T, Tang, Y, & York, M. (2019). The characteristics of targets of bullying among Chinese youth attending key versus non-key schools. A mixed-methods analysis. Journal of Interpersonal Violence. https://doi.org/10.1177/088626051984572

Lee, Y-T, Chen, X., Zhao, Y, & Chen, W (2018). The quest for today's totemic psychology: A new look at Wundt, Freud and other scientists. Journal of Pacific Rim Psychology, 12, 1–13.

Lee, Y-T., Xu, C. J, Zhao, Y. P. & Chen, S. (2018). The three-dimensional theory and concept of stereotypes: Controversy and advancement of Its Potency, Accuracy and Evaluation. Journal of South China Normal University (in English and in Chinese), 2, 5–16.

Lee, Y-T. (2016). The Dao of harmonious leadership: Daoist Big-Five. Tsinghua Business Review, 10, 60–67.

Lee, Y-T., Xu, C, Liu, Y, & Chen, W. (2015). The Chinese Daoist theory of water-like personality: A correlational study of Daoist Big-Five leadership, Machiavellianism, and good human nature. American Review of China Studies, 16(2), 27–48.

Lee, Y-T, & Kanazawa, S., K. (2015). An Introduction to the special issue on the nature and evolution of totemism, Shamanism, religions, and spirituality. Psychology of Religion and Spirituality, 7(4), 265–266.

Lee, Y-T., Beddow, M., Chan, S., & Xu, C. (2015). Evolutionary and cross-cultural investigation of totemism, Daoism and other spiritual beliefs. Psychology of Religion and Spirituality, 7(4), 278–285.

Books & Book Chapters

Lee, Y-T. (2019). What can professionals learn from Daoist philosophy? Application of Daoist ideas to therapy and administration. In Y-T Lee & L. Holt (eds.), Dao and Daoist ideas for scientists, humanists, and practitioners. Hauppauge, NY: Nova Science Publishers, Inc.

Lee, Y-T., & Holt, L. (2019). Toward universal Dao and Daoism: Commonalities and future directions. In Y-T Lee & L. Holt (eds.), Dao and Daoist ideas for scientists, humanists, and practitioners. Hauppauge, NY: Nova Science Publishers, Inc.

Ottati, V., Lee, Y-T., & Bryant, F. (2019). Daoist Thought, leadership and open-minded cognition, In Y-T Lee & L. Holt (eds.), Dao and Daoist ideas for scientists, humanists, and practitioners. Hauppauge, NY: Nova Science Publishers, Inc.

Chen, W & Lee, Y-T. (2019). Collaboration and teamwork: Application of Daoist big five theory to classroom learning. In Y-T Lee & L. Holt (eds.), Dao and Daoist ideas for scientists, humanists, and practitioners. Hauppauge, NY: Nova Science Publishers, Inc.

Lee, Y-T. & Zhao, Y. (2019). Ancient Daoist perspectives and modern stereotype research as approaches to diversity management and human differences appreciation. In Y-T Lee & L. Holt (eds.), Dao and Daoist ideas for scientists, humanists, and practitioners. Hauppauge, NY: Nova Science Publishers, Inc.

Wang, F., Lee, Y-T., Zhou, W., & Wang, Z. (2019). Daoist contributions to sciences in ancient China. In Y-T Lee & L. Holt (eds.), Dao and Daoist ideas for scientists, humanists, and practitioners. Hauppauge, NY: Nova Science Publishers, Inc.

Lee, Y-T., Zhao, Y., Montoya, R. & Xu, C. (2019). Nature as the common theme of Daoism, Totemism and Darwinism: The evolutionary crossroads of sciences and humanities. In Y-T Lee & L. Holt (eds.), Dao and Daoist ideas for scientists, humanists, and practitioners. Hauppauge, NY: Nova Science Publishers, Inc.

Lee, Y-T., Holt, L., & Jamnik, M. (2019). Introduction: What is Dao or Daoism? Why is it important? In Y-T Lee & L. Holt (eds.), Dao and Daoist ideas for scientists, humanists, and practitioners. Hauppauge, NY: Nova Science Publishers, Inc.

Lee, Y-T. & Holt, L.B. Eds. (2019). Dao and Daoist ideas for scientists, humanists, and practitioners. Hauppauge, NY: Nova Science Publishers, Inc..

Lee, Y-T. Yang, H., & Wang, M. (2014). Daoist harmony as a worldview. In T. Matyok, M. Flaherty, H. Tuso, J. Senehi, & S. Byrne (Eds.), Peace on Earth: The role of religion in peace and conflict studies (pp. 303–318). Lanhman, MD: Lexington Books of Rowman & Littlefield.
