= America's Islamic Heritage Museum =

Museum in Washington D.C., United States

- Established: April 30, 2011
- Location: 2315 Martin Luther King Jr Ave SE Washington D.C., US
- Coordinates: 38°51′48.5″N 76°59′28.5″W
- Type: History museum
- Director: Amir Muhammad
- Website: https://aihmuseum.org/

The America's Islamic Heritage Museum is a history museum located in Washington, DC, United States. It is a non-profit organization that displays a variety of Islamic artifacts, photographs, and stories dating from the 16th century up to the 21st century. Before it was a museum, it was a traveling exhibit called Collections and Stories of American Muslims (CSAM). Later, the traveling exhibit turned into a museum that was established on April 30, 2011. In 2024, the history museum introduced its grand reopening in a new constructed, mixed-use space at the ground floor, sharing it with a housing unit and other rental spaces.

== Organization history ==
=== Before the museum ===
In 1996 Collections & Stories of American Muslims, Inc. (CSAM) was established. In the years that followed CSAM travelled across the country sharing the history of Muslims in America with the public. This included stops at the DuSable Museum of African American History, Harvard University, Howard University, the Malcolm X & Dr. Betty Shabazz Memorial and Educational Center, Rutgers University, the Anacostia Community Museum, Stanford University, University of Florida, University of Illinois at Chicago, University of Illinois at Urbana-Champaign, the University of Pittsburgh and the U.S. Department of State's International Visitor Leadership Program. The exhibition also travelled abroad, visiting Qatar and Nigeria. On April 30, 2011, the museum opened to the public at the former Clara Muhammad School in Washington, DC.

=== Grand reopening ===
On March 8, 2024, the America's Islamic Heritage Museum's grand reopening at the Clara—a new affordable housing spot and the new permanent home for the museum—has 11,000 square feet of new space. The new home for the museum is set to open in the winter of 2024.

== Museum content ==
Much of the museum's content is displayed on a series of panels covering a diverse set of personalities including Estevanico, Omar ibn Said, Hajj Ali, Yarrow Mamout, and Mohammed Alexander Russell Webb. It makes note of America's unique ethnic groups and migration patterns, including the hard to define Melungeons and the immigration of Bosnian Muslims starting in the 19th century. There is an extensive section on the Nation of Islam with old newspapers, photographs and other memorabilia. The museum also makes note of several towns with Islamic references including Mahomet, Illinois, Mahomet, Texas, Mecca, Indiana, and Elkader, Iowa.

=== Hours ===
The museum is open Tuesday – Saturday from 10:00 am – 5:00 pm, Sunday 12:00 pm – 5:00 pm and closed on Monday.

== See also ==
- Islam in the United States
- Islam in the Americas
