= Cold spraying =

Coating deposition method

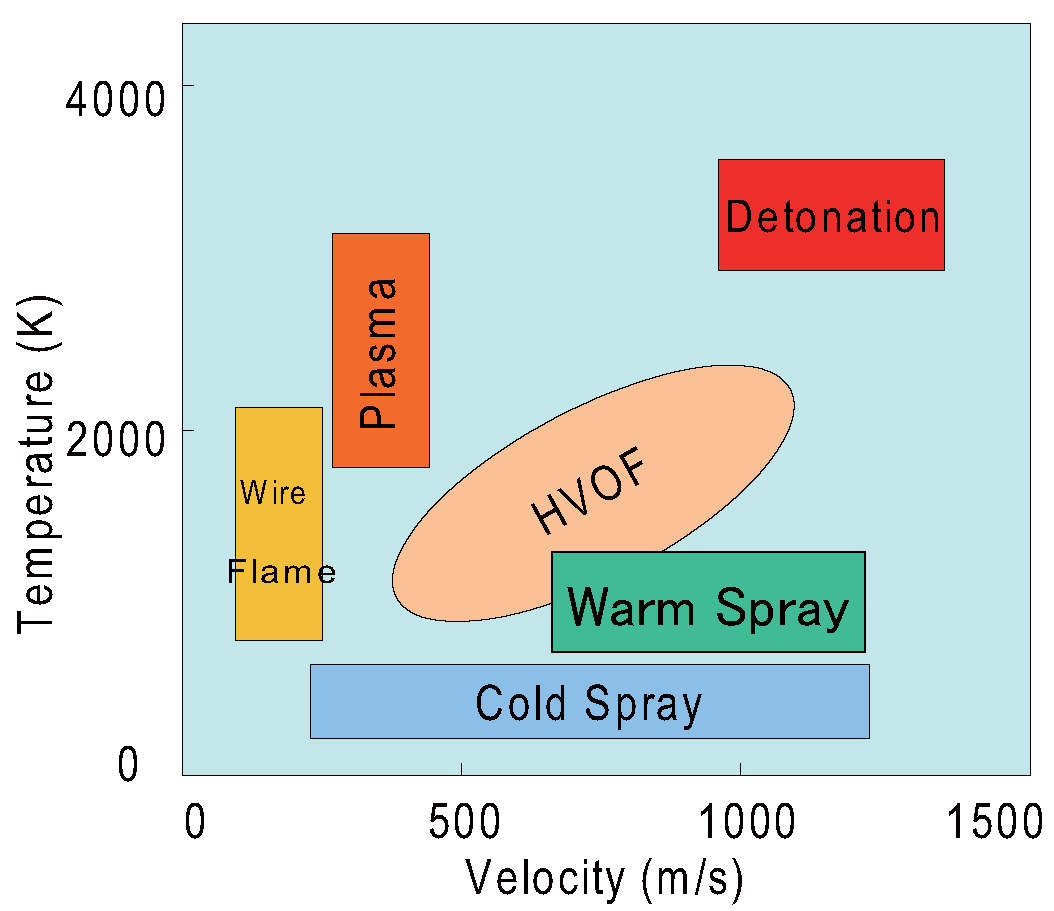
Particle temperature and velocity for different thermal spraying processes

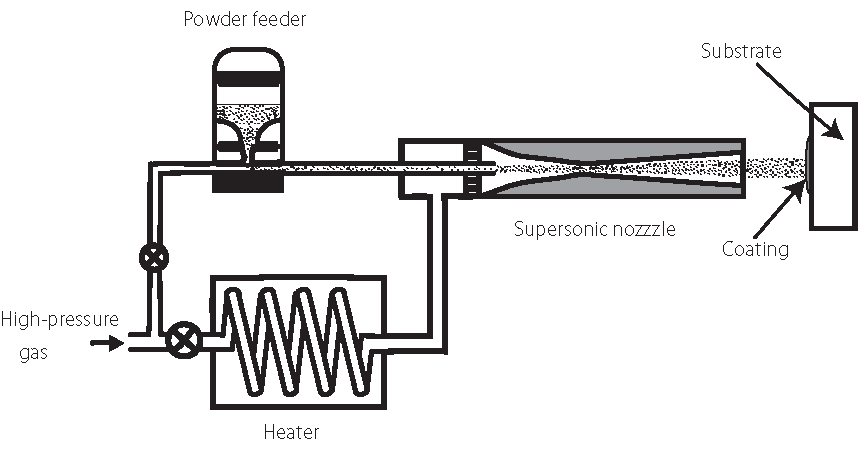
Schematics of cold spraying

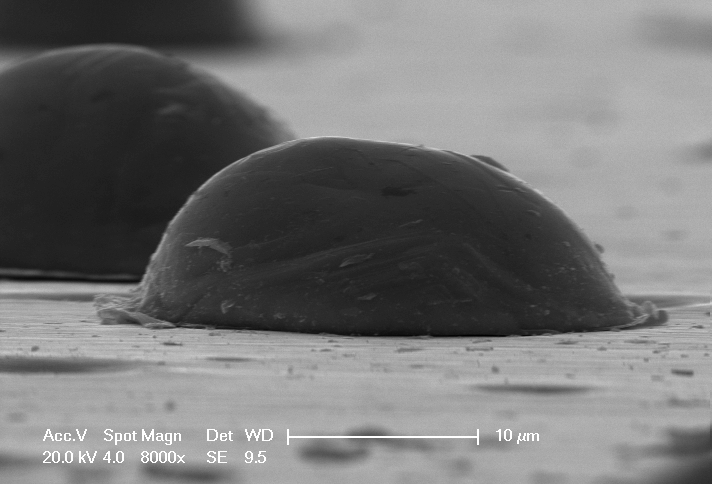
SEM image of a cold sprayed titanium particle bonded to steel surface

Gas dynamic cold spraying or cold spraying (CS) is a coating deposition method. Solid powders (1 to 50 micrometers in diameter) are accelerated in a supersonic gas jet to velocities up to ca. 1200 m/s. During impact with the substrate, particles undergo plastic deformation and adhere to the surface. To achieve a uniform thickness the spraying nozzle is scanned along the substrate. Metals, polymers, ceramics, composite materials and nanocrystalline powders can be deposited using cold spraying. The kinetic energy of the particles, supplied by the expansion of the gas, is converted to plastic deformation energy during bonding. Unlike thermal spraying techniques, e.g., plasma spraying, arc spraying, flame spraying, or high velocity oxygen fuel (HVOF), the powders are not melted during the spraying process.

== History ==
Cold spraying was developed by Russian scientists in the 1990s. While experimenting with the particle erosion of the target, which was exposed to a two-phase high-velocity flow of fine powder in a wind tunnel, scientists observed accidental rapid formation of coatings. This coating technique was commercialized in the 1990s.

== Types ==
There are two types of CS. High pressure cold spraying (HPCS) in which the working gas is nitrogen or helium at pressures above 1.5 MPa, a flow rate of more than 2 m^{3}/min, heating power of 18 kW. It is used for spraying pure metal powders with the sizes of 5–50 μm. In low-pressure cold spraying (LPCS), the working gas is a compressed gas with pressure 0.5–1.0 MPa, flow rate 0.5–2 m^{3}/min and the heating power 3–5 kW. It is used for spraying a mechanical mixture of metal and ceramic powders. The inclusion of a ceramic component in the mixture provides high-quality coatings with relatively low energy consumption.

== Basic principles ==
The most prevailing bonding theory in cold spraying is attributed to "adiabatic shear instability" which occurs at the particle substrate interface at or beyond a certain velocity called critical velocity. When a spherical particle travelling at critical velocity impacts a substrate, a strong pressure field propagates spherically into the particle and substrate from the point of contact. As a result of this pressure field, a shear load is generated which accelerates the material laterally and causes localized shear straining. The shear loading under critical conditions leads to adiabatic shear instability where thermal softening is locally dominant over work strain and strain rate hardening, which leads to a discontinuous jump in strain and temperature and breakdown of flow stresses. This adiabatic shear instability phenomena results in viscous flow of material at an outward flowing direction with temperatures close to melting temperature of the material. This material jetting is also a known phenomenon in explosive welding of materials.

== Key parameters in cold spraying ==
There are several factors that can affect the quality of cold-sprayed coatings and the deposition efficiency. Main influential factors are:

- Gas type, e.g. air, nitrogen, helium
- Gas pressure
- Gas temperature (the maximum temperature in cold spraying is ca. 900 °C)
- Particle size
- Feedstock material properties, e.g. density, strength, melting temperature
- Nozzle type
- Substrate
- Deposition kinetics (gun transverse speed, scan velocity, number of passes ...)
- Standoff distance, i.e. the distance between the cold spray nozzle and the substrate.

Cold spray parameters are selected with respect to the desired coating characteristics and economic considerations. This can be done by considering correlations between process parameters and final coating properties. There are also software packages available for this purpose.

== Advantages and disadvantages ==
CS has many advantages that make the technology potentially very competitive. Being a cold process, the initial physical and chemical particle properties are retained and the heating of the substrate is minimal, resulting in cold-worked microstructure of coatings where no melting and solidification happen. Dynamic recrystallization with refined grains has been observed between particle and particle bonding region. Furthermore, the technology allows to spray thermally sensitive materials and highly dissimilar materials combinations, due to the fact that the adhesion mechanism is purely mechanical.

Other advantages are:

- High thermal and electrical conductivity of coatings;
- High density and hardness of coatings;
- High homogeneity of coatings;
- Low shrinking;
- Possibility to spray micro-sized particles (5–10 μm);
- Possibility to spray nanomaterials and amorphous materials;
- Short stand off distance;
- Minimum surface preparation;
- Low energy consumption;
- Possibility to obtain complex shapes and internal surfaces;
- High productivity due to high power feed rate;
- High deposition rates and efficiencies;
- Possibility to collect and reuse 100% of particles;
- No toxic wastes;
- No combustion;
- Increased operational safety due to the absence of high temperature gas jets and radiation.

The jet obtained is a high-density particle beam due to the small size of the nozzle (10–15 mm^{2}) and the short stand-off distance (25 mm). This results in high focus of the jet and precise control over the deposition area. Finally, inducing compressive stresses allows to obtain dense uniform and ultra-thick (20 μm – 50 mm) coatings.

On the other side, some difficulties can be found. For instance, it is difficult to spray hard and brittle materials because, in this case, mechanical adhesion through plastic deformation could be not as effective as it is for ductile particles. Other problems could include:

- Near-zero ductility in the as-sprayed condition;
- Need for ductile substrate;
- Difficulty in processing pure ceramics and some alloys as work-hardening alloys;
- high cost of Helium;
- fouling and erosion of the nozzle.

== Applications ==
=== Coatings ===
The ability for CS to deposit materials that are phase-sensitive or temperature-sensitive has positioned the technique to prepare coatings not possible with other thermal spray techniques. CS can generally be used to produce coatings of a wide variety of metals, alloys, and metal-based composites, including those materials that have an exceptionally high melting temperatures (e.g. tantalum, niobium, superalloys). The process is also valuable for depositing materials that are extremely sensitive to the presence of oxygen and will readily oxidize at modest elevated temperatures – a result which is deleterious to the performance of these materials. Some examples of oxygen sensitive coatings that are commonly produced with CS are aluminum, copper, titanium, and carbide composites (e.g. tungsten carbide), as well as coatings made from amorphous alloys.

Additional developments in CS are related to the deposition of ceramic materials on metals, notably titanium dioxide for photocatalytic effects, and the use of CS in additive manufacturing.

=== Repair ===
Cold spraying is now used to repair machine parts in a matter of minutes. Metal (nickel alloys) particles travel in a blend of nitrogen and helium gas and gradually stack up on the damaged part to recreate the desired surface. A robot controls the movement of the sprayer. The U.S. Army uses the technology to repair a component in Blackhawk helicopters. General Electric is adapting the technology for civilian applications. The US Navy has adopted cold spray welding across its global operations on an experimental basis.

=== Manufacturing ===
Additive manufacturing using cold spray technology can be used to develop parts and components rapidly with deposition rates as high as 45 kg/hour – much faster than other additive manufacturing methods.

Unlike other additive manufacturing methods such as selective laser melting or electron beam additive manufacturing, cold spraying does not melt metals. This means that metals are not affected by heat-related distortion, and parts do not need to be manufactured in an inert gas or vacuum sealed environment, allowing the creation of much larger structures. The world's largest and fastest metal 3D printer has a build envelope of 9×3×1.5 m and utilizes gas dynamic cold spray. Manufacturing with cold spray technology provides advantages such as the ability to create shapes with no shape or size constraints, more efficient buy-to-fly ratio when compared to machining, and capable of fusing dissimilar metals to create hybrid metal parts – materials such as titanium alloys, copper, zinc, stainless steel, aluminium, nickel, even hastelloy and inconel can be sprayed together.
