= Thermal history coating =

A thermal history coating (THC) is a robust coating containing various non-toxic chemical compounds whose crystal structures irreversibly change at high temperatures. This allows for temperature measurements and thermal analysis to be performed on intricate and inaccessible components, which operate in harsh environments. Like thermal barrier coatings, THCs provide protection from intense heat to the surfaces on which they are applied. The temperature range that THCs provide accurate temperature measurements in is 900 °C to 1400 °C with an accuracy of ±10 °C.

== Application of THCs ==
THCs are applied by atmospheric plasma spraying, which is a thermal spraying technique. This ensures that the coatings are robust to allow long life-times in harsh environments, such as on jet engine components, which experience temperatures in excess of 1000 °C and angular velocities of up to 10,000rpm (revolutions per minute).

== Temperature Measurement ==
=== Phosphorescent Properties ===
THCs are composed of phosphor materials, whose luminescent characteristics are temperature- and duration-dependent. Phosphor thermometry is the measurement technique used for determining the past temperatures of THCs, whereby the luminescent characteristics of the coatings are exploited and matched to calibration tables.

Temperature mapping across surface of heated disc

=== Instrumentation ===
The phosphorescence of THCs is excited by use of an external light source such as a laser pen. An optical system then collects a reflected light signal, whose characteristics provide information on the crystal structure of the THC. Crystal structure properties are then converted into temperatures, which had previously been experience by the coatings. This allows for point measurements to be made across the coated surfaces of components and allows thermal analysis to be carried out.

== Applications ==
=== R&D ===
THCs are used in high temperature applications where temperature knowledge is essential in research and development programmes, for example in identifying hot spots, which could lead to structural damage of components.

=== Warranty ===
As the THCs provide historic temperature information, they can be used as warranty tools, where certain components, such as valves or particular engine or machinery components must not exceed certain temperatures.

== Other High-Temperature Detection Technologies ==
- Thermocouple
- Thermocrystal
- Pyrometer
