= Intercooler =

Heat exchanger used to cool a gas after compression

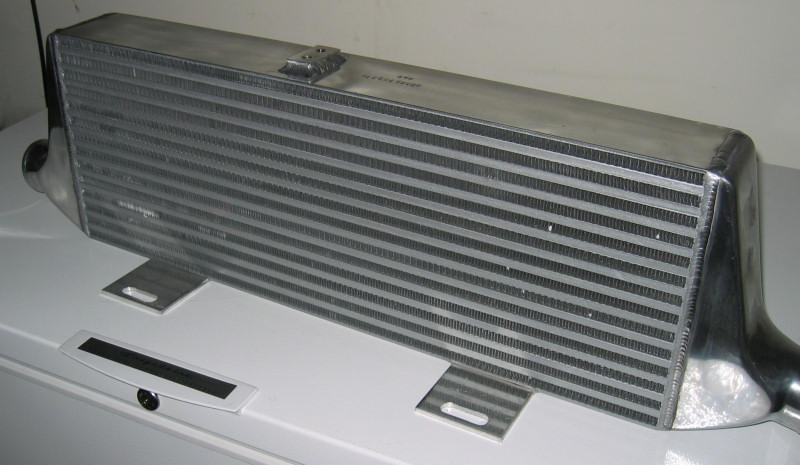
Front-mounted air-to-air intercooler

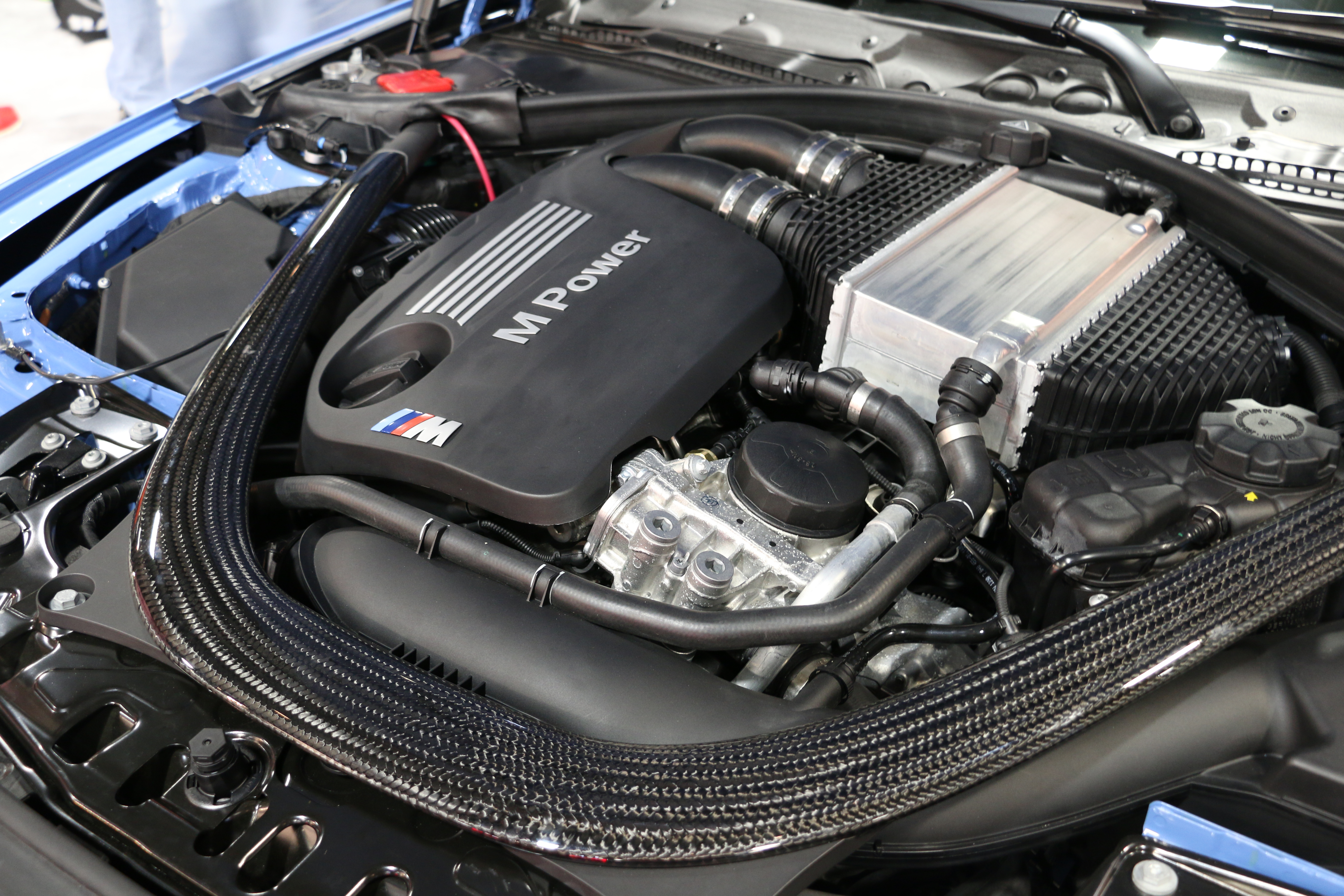
Top-mounted air-to-liquid intercooler (the silver cuboid-shaped part) on a BMW S55 turbocharged engine

An intercooler is a heat exchanger used to cool a gas after compression. Often found in turbocharged engines, intercoolers are also used in air compressors, air conditioners, refrigeration and gas turbines.

== Internal combustion engines ==
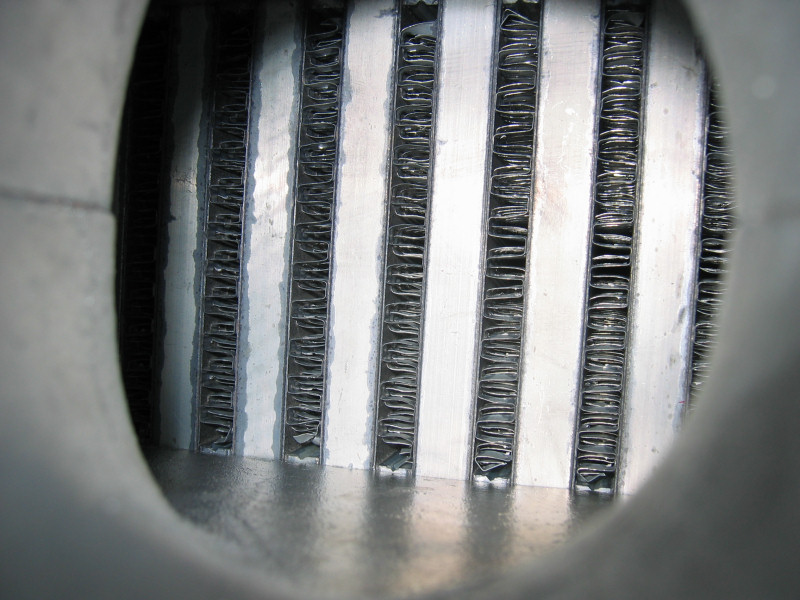
Cooling fins inside an air-to-air intercooler

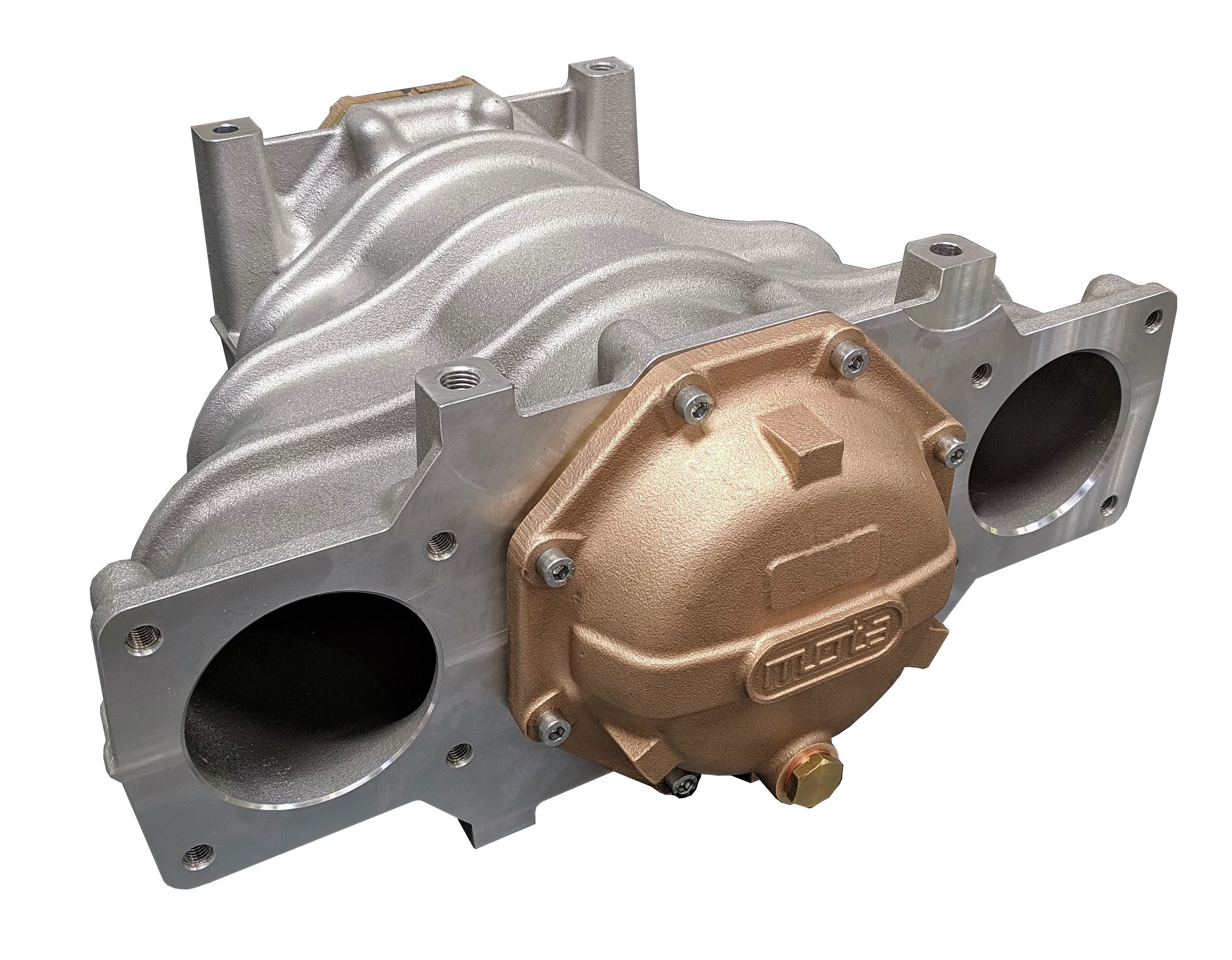
Air-to-liquid intercooler for a marine engine

Most commonly used with turbocharged engines, an intercooler is used to counteract the heat of compression and heat soak in the pressurised intake air. By reducing the temperature of the intake air, the air becomes denser (allowing more fuel to be injected, resulting in increased power) and less likely to suffer from pre-ignition or knocking. Additional cooling can be provided by externally spraying a fine mist onto the intercooler surface, or even into the intake air itself, to further reduce intake charge temperature through evaporative cooling.

Intercoolers can vary dramatically in size, shape and design, depending on the performance and space requirements of the system. Many passenger cars use either front-mounted intercoolers located in the front bumper or grill opening, or top-mounted intercoolers located above the engine. An intercooling system can use an air-to-air design, an air-to-liquid design, or a combination of both.

=== Multiple stages of compression ===
In automotive engines where multiple stages of forced-induction are used (e.g. a sequential twin-turbo or twin-charged engine), the intercooling usually takes place after the last turbocharger/supercharger. However it is also possible to use separate intercoolers for each stage of the turbocharging/supercharging, such as in the JCB Dieselmax land speed record racing car. Some aircraft engines also use an intercooler for each stage of the forced induction. In engines with two-stage turbocharging, the term intercooler can specifically refer to the cooler between the two turbochargers and the term aftercooler is used for the cooler located between the second-stage turbo and the engine. However, the terms intercooler and charge-air cooler are also often used regardless of the location in the intake system.

=== Method of heat transfer ===
Air-to-air intercoolers are heat exchangers that transfer heat from the intake air directly to the atmosphere. Alternatively, air-to-liquid intercoolers transfer the heat from the intake air to intermediate liquid (usually water), which in turn transfers the heat to the atmosphere. The heat exchanger that transfers the heat from the fluid to the atmosphere operates in a similar fashion to the main radiator in a water-cooled engine's cooling system, or in some cases the engine's cooling system is also used for the intercooling system. Air-to-liquid intercoolers are usually heavier than their air-to-air counterparts, due to additional components making up the system (e.g. water circulation pump, radiator, fluid, and plumbing).

The majority of marine engines use air-to-liquid intercoolers, since the water of the lake, river or sea can easily be accessed for cooling purposes. In addition, most marine engines are located in closed compartments where obtaining a good flow of cooling air for an air-to-air unit would be difficult. Marine intercoolers take the form of a tubular heat exchanger with the air passing around a series of tubes within the cooler casing, and sea water circulating inside the tubes. The main materials used for this kind of application are meant to resist sea water corrosion: copper-nickel for the tubes and bronze for the sea water covers.

=== Alternatives ===
An alternative to using intercoolers - which is rarely used these days - was to inject excess fuel into the combustion chamber, so that the vaporization process would cool the cylinders in order to prevent knocking. However the downsides to this method were increased fuel consumption and exhaust gas emissions.

== Air compressors ==
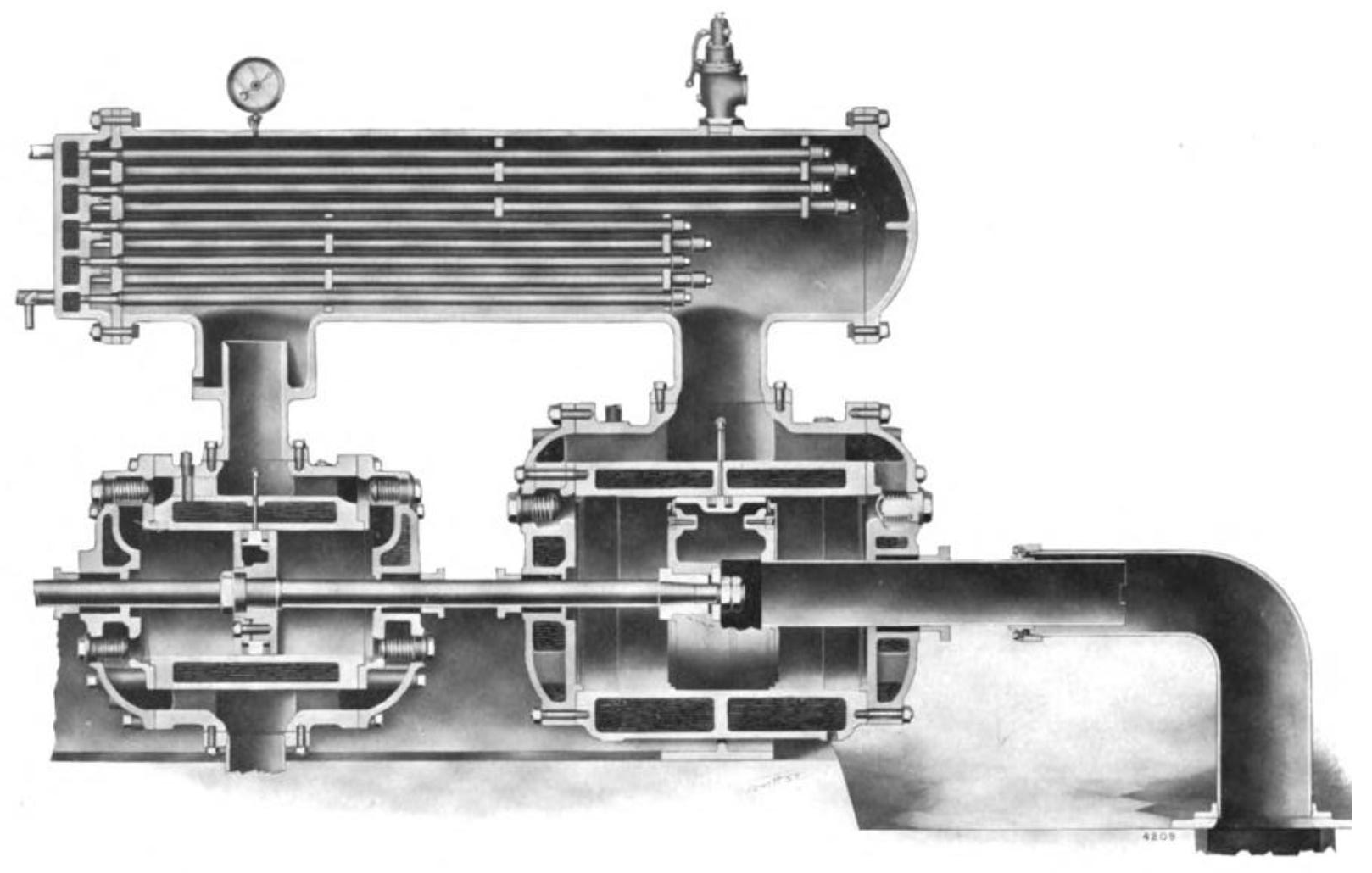
Top-mounted intercooler on a 1910 Ingersoll Rand two-stage air compressor

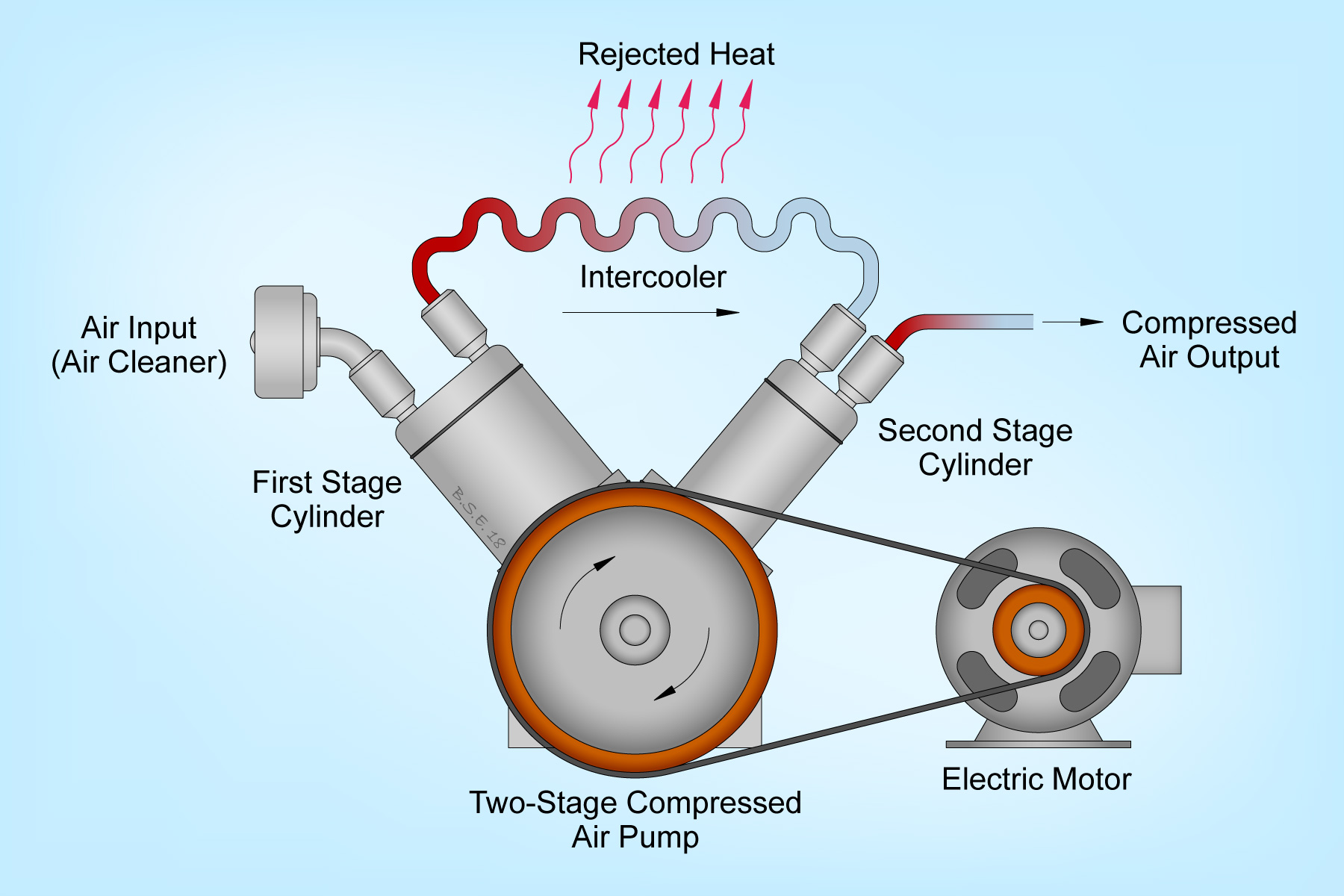
Schematic of a two-stage compressor with intercooler

Intercoolers are used to remove the waste heat from the first stage of two-stage air compressors. Two-stage air compressors are manufactured because of their inherent efficiency. The cooling action of the intercooler is principally responsible for this higher efficiency, bringing it closer to Carnot efficiency. Removing the heat-of-compression from the discharge of the first stage has the effect of densifying the air charge. This, in turn, allows the second stage to produce more work from its fixed compression ratio. Adding an intercooler to the setup requires additional investments.
