= David R. Clarke =

Material scientist

- Education: University of Cambridge
- Awards: James Mueller Award, ACS; Distinguished Life Member, ACS; Member, NAE; Fellow, APS
- Scientific career
- Fields: Material Science, Engineering
- Workplaces: SEAS, Harvard University; UCSB
- Doctoral advisor: L. M. Brown

David R. Clarke is a material scientist and the inaugural Extended Tarr Family Professor of Material Science and Applied Physics at Harvard John A. Paulson School of Engineering and Applied Sciences (SEAS). He is the principal investigator of the Materials Discovery and Applications Group.

The American Ceramic Society (ACerS) considers Clarke's paper "On the Equilibrium Thickness of Intergranular Glass Phases in Ceramic Materials" (1987) one of the 11 best papers in 110 years of publications on ceramics and glasses. Clarke was elected a member of the National Academy of Engineering in 1999 "for research on the role of grain boundary phases and their importance to the engineering of technical ceramics". He became a Distinguished Life Member of ACerS in 2009.

== Education and career ==
Clarke received his bachelor's degree in applied science from the University of Sussex, England in 1968 and joined the National Physical Laboratory (NPL) as a scientific officer. He completed his doctoral degree in 1974, from the Cavendish Laboratory, University of Cambridge and rejoined NPL to work on fiber composites.

Subsequently, he moved to the US and the University of California, Berkeley where he worked from 1974 to 1977 as a lecturer. Afterwards, he held various positions at prestigious institutions such as Rockwell International Science Center (1977-1982), Massachusetts Institute of Technology (MIT, 1982-1983) and IBM Research Division (1983-1990), where he became senior manager of materials.

In 1990, he was appointed as both Professor of Materials and Professor of Mechanical Engineering at University of California, Santa Barbara (UCSB). He served as the department chair of the Materials Department at UCSB from 1991 to 1998. He served as the associate dean of the College of Engineering from 2002 to 2004.

In 2009, Clarke was appointed as Gordon McKay Professor of Materials and Applied Physics at Harvard University. He is the inaugural holder of the position of Extended Tarr Family Chair of Materials and Applied Physics at Harvard University.

== Research and teaching ==
Clarke studies the mechanical behavior of materials including ceramics, semiconductors, metals, polymers and thermoelectrics.

He is best known for his work on the fundamentals, properties and applications of ceramics. He established the existence of thin glassy phases at boundaries between crystalline grains in ceramics, work now regarded as foundational to understanding the behavior of advanced ceramics at high temperatures. The microstructural stability of the intergranular phase controls temperature- and electrically-related properties of technical ceramics.

In 1987 Clarke proposed that nanometer-thick intergranular films (IGFs) in ceramics exhibit an equilibrium thickness. He applied a model adapted from the wetting community to explain their existence and the consequences for their properties at high-temperatures. The equilibrium thickness represents a balance among attractive and repulsive interactions at interfaces. Clarke proposed a model for the discovery of low thermal conductivity ceramics, leading to the identification of a wide range of novel candidates.

Clarke developed novel techniques in piezospectroscopy which are used worldwide to measure stress in materials. Significant contributions include the observation of dislocations at crack tips in silicon, the loss of crystalline structure in silicon and germanium following indentation, and identifying a failure mechanisms in thin films.

His group has studied thermal barrier coatings (TBCs) on turbine blades used in aircraft. They have explored TBC's thermal conductivity and the conditions leading to the degradation and failure of TBCs.

Another area of research is dielectric elastomers, soft materials with good insulating properties that could potentially be used in soft robots. Clarke's lab have combined materials in a way that avoids two problems that limit the design of electrically-controlled soft actuators: high voltage and pre-stretching.

Clarke is a member of the National Academy of Engineering, a Fellow of the American Physical Society, a Fellow of the American Ceramic Society, and a recipient of Alexander von Humboldt Foundation Senior Scientist Award. He was listed as an author of one of the 11 best papers in the 110 year history of publications on ceramics and glasses. He has been an Editor of the Annual Review of Materials Research and is an Associate Editor for the Journal of the American Ceramic Society. He has over twenty patents.

Over the years he has taught a variety of undergraduate and graduate level courses in materials, ranging from introductory classes to courses in phase equilibria, optical materials, phase transformations, thermodynamics and composites. He currently teaches seminars on "Glass" and "Materials, Energy and Society" at the undergraduate Freshman level, and the required course on "Fundamentals of Heat Transfer" course for students studying Mechanical Engineering at Harvard University.

== Awards and honors ==
- 2014, James Mueller Award, Engineering Ceramics Division, American Ceramic Society (ACerS)
- 2009, Distinguished Life Member of the American Ceramic Society (ACerS)
- 2008, Author of one of the 11 most significant papers in the 110 years of publication on ceramics and glasses, listed by the American Ceramic Society
- 2008, New Materials Award, from the National Institute of Materials Science (Japan), (jointly with A. G. Evans and C. G. Levi, UCSB)
- 1999, Edward C. Henry Award, Electronics Division, ACerS
- 1999, Robert B. Sosman Memorial Award, ACerS
- 1999, Van Horn Lectureship, Case Western Reserve University
- 1999, Elected to the National Academy of Engineering
- 1998, Morrison Lectureship, Brockhouse Institute, McMaster University
- 1995, Academician, International Academy of Ceramics
- 1993, Alexander von Humboldt Foundation Senior Scientist Award
- 1989, Richard M. Fulrath Pacific Memorial Award, ACerS
- 1986, Fellow of the American Physical Society
- 1985, Fellow of the American Ceramic Society
- 1982, The Ross Coffin Purdy Award, ACerS

== Selected publications ==
- Clarke, D R (August 1987). "Grain Boundaries in Polycrystalline Ceramics". Annual Review of Materials Science. 17 (1): 57–74. Bibcode:1987AnRMS..17...57C. doi:10.1146/annurev.ms.17.080187.000421. ISSN 0084-6600.
- Clarke, David R. (January 1987). "On the Equilibrium Thickness of Intergranular Glass Phases in Ceramic Materials". Journal of the American Ceramic Society. 70 (1): 15–22. doi:10.1111/j.1151-2916.1987.tb04846.x.
- Clarke, D. R. (1 January 1991). "Glassy Phases in Ceramics". Concise Encyclopedia of Advanced Ceramic Materials. Pergamon. pp. 183–187. doi:10.1016/B978-0-08-034720-2.50056-3. ISBN 978-0-08-034720-2.
- He, Jun; Clarke, David R. (May 1995). "Determination of the Piezospectroscopic Coefficients for Chromium-Doped Sapphire". Journal of the American Ceramic Society. 78 (5): 1347–1353. doi:10.1111/j.1151-2916.1995.tb08493.x.
- He, J.; Clarke, D. R. (8 September 1997). "Determination of fibre strength distributions from bundle tests using optical luminescence spectroscopy". Proceedings of the Royal Society A: Mathematical, Physical and Engineering Sciences. 453 (1964): 1881–1901. Bibcode:1997RSPSA.453.1881H. doi:10.1098/rspa.1997.0101. S2CID 136831425.
- Clarke, David R. (January 2003). "Materials selection guidelines for low thermal conductivity thermal barrier coatings". Surface and Coatings Technology. 163–164: 67–74. doi:10.1016/S0257-8972(02)00593-5.
- Clarke, David R. (22 December 2004). "Varistor Ceramics". Journal of the American Ceramic Society. 82 (3): 485–502. doi:10.1111/j.1151-2916.1999.tb01793.x.
- Winter, Michael R.; Clarke, David R. (February 2007). "Oxide Materials with Low Thermal Conductivity". Journal of the American Ceramic Society. 90 (2): 533–540. doi:10.1111/j.1551-2916.2006.01410.x.
- Chambers, M.D.; Clarke, D.R. (1 August 2009). "Doped Oxides for High-Temperature Luminescence and Lifetime Thermometry". Annual Review of Materials Research. 39 (1): 325–359. Bibcode:2009AnRMS..39..325C. doi:10.1146/annurev-matsci-112408-125237. ISSN 1531-7331.
- Clarke, David R.; Oechsner, Matthias; Padture, Nitin P. (9 October 2012). "Thermal-barrier coatings for more efficient gas-turbine engines". MRS Bulletin. 37 (10): 891–898. Bibcode:2012MRSBu..37..891C. doi:10.1557/mrs.2012.232.
