= Electron-beam physical vapor deposition =

Form of physical vapor deposition

Electron-beam physical vapor deposition, or EBPVD, is a form of physical vapor deposition in which a target anode is bombarded with an electron beam given off by a charged tungsten filament under high vacuum. The electron beam causes atoms from the target to transform into the gaseous phase. These atoms then precipitate into solid form, coating everything in the vacuum chamber (within line of sight) with a thin layer of the anode material.

== Introduction ==
Thin-film deposition is a process applied in the semiconductor industry to grow electronic materials, in the aerospace industry to form thermal and chemical barrier coatings to protect surfaces against corrosive environments, in optics to impart the desired reflective and transmissive properties to a substrate and elsewhere in industry to modify surfaces to have a variety of desired properties. The deposition process can be broadly classified into physical vapor deposition (PVD) and chemical vapor deposition (CVD). In CVD, the film growth takes place at high temperatures, leading to the formation of corrosive gaseous products, and it may leave impurities in the film. The PVD process can be carried out at lower deposition temperatures and without corrosive products, but deposition rates are typically lower. Electron-beam physical vapor deposition, however, yields a high deposition rate from 0.1 to 100 μm/min at relatively low substrate temperatures, with very high material utilization efficiency. The schematic of an EBPVD system is shown in Fig 1.

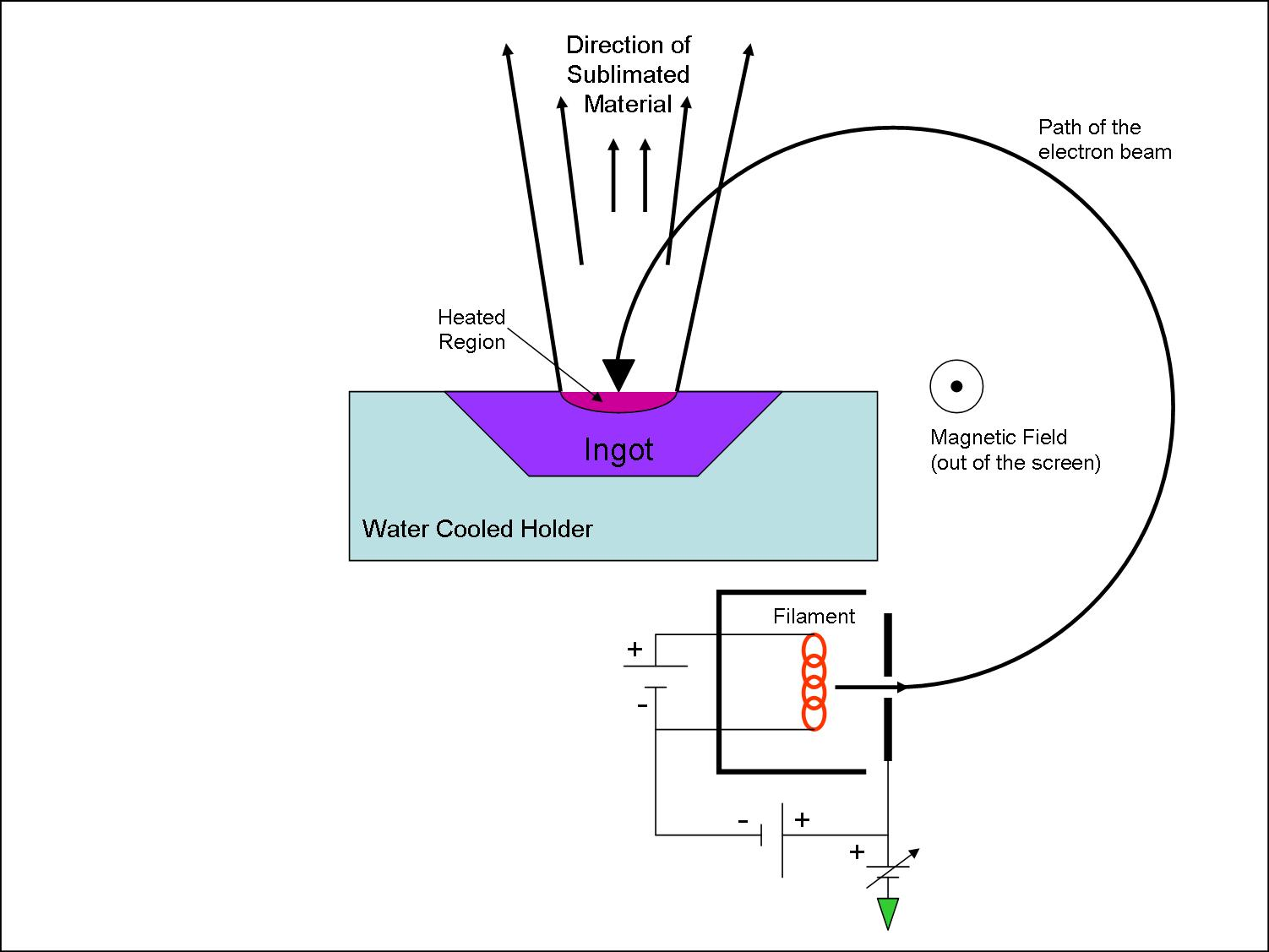
Fig 1. Electromagnetic alignment. The ingot is held at a positive potential relative to the filament. To avoid chemical interactions between the filament and the ingot material, the filament is kept out of sight. A magnetic field is employed to direct the electron beam from its source to the ingot location. An additional electric field can be used to steer the beam over the ingot surface allowing uniform heating.

== Thin-film deposition process ==
In an EBPVD system, the deposition chamber must be evacuated to a pressure of at least 7.5×10^{−5} Torr (10^{−2} Pa) to allow passage of electrons from the electron gun to the evaporation material, which can be in the form of an ingot or rod. Alternatively, some modern EBPVD systems utilize an arc-suppression system and can be operated at vacuum levels as low as 5.0×10^{−3} Torr, for situations such as parallel use with magnetron sputtering. Multiple types of evaporation materials and electron guns can be used simultaneously in a single EBPVD system, each having a power from tens to hundreds of kilowatts. Electron beams can be generated by thermionic emission, field electron emission or the anodic arc method. The generated electron beam is accelerated to a high kinetic energy and directed towards the evaporation material. Upon striking the evaporation material, the electrons will lose their energy very rapidly. The kinetic energy of the electrons is converted into other forms of energy through interactions with the evaporation material. The thermal energy that is produced heats up the evaporation material causing it to melt or sublimate. Once temperature and vacuum level are sufficiently high, vapor will result from the melt or solid. The resulting vapor can then be used to coat surfaces. Accelerating voltages can be between 3 and 40 kV. When the accelerating voltage is 20–25 kV and the beam current is a few amperes, 85% of the electron's kinetic energy can be converted into thermal energy. Some of the incident electron energy is lost through the production of X-rays and secondary electron emission.

There are three main EBPVD configurations, electromagnetic alignment, electromagnetic focusing and the pendant drop configuration. Electromagnetic alignment and electromagnetic focusing use evaporation material that is in the form of an ingot, while the pendant drop configuration uses a rod. Ingots are enclosed in a copper crucible or hearth, while a rod will be mounted at one end in a socket. Both the crucible and socket must be cooled. This is typically done by water circulation. In the case of ingots, molten liquid can form on its surface, which can be kept constant by vertical displacement of the ingot. The evaporation rate may be on the order of 10^{−2} g/(cm^{2}·s).

Platinum being heated and evaporated in an EBPVD system from an ingot in a hearth. The electron beam is continuously swept across the ingot by a pair of electromagnets.

== Material evaporation methods ==
Refractory carbides like titanium carbide and borides like titanium boride and zirconium boride can evaporate without undergoing decomposition in the vapor phase. These compounds are deposited by direct evaporation. In this process these compounds, compacted in the form of an ingot, are evaporated in vacuum by the focused high-energy electron beam, and the vapors are directly condensed over the substrate.

Certain refractory oxides and carbides undergo fragmentation during their evaporation by the electron beam, resulting in a stoichiometry that is different from the initial material. For example, alumina, when evaporated by electron beam, dissociates into aluminum, AlO_{3} and Al_{2}O. Some refractory carbides like silicon carbide and tungsten carbide decompose upon heating, and the dissociated elements have different volatilities. These compounds can be deposited on the substrate either by reactive evaporation or by co-evaporation. In the reactive evaporation process, the metal is evaporated from the ingot by the electron beam. The vapors are carried by the reactive gas, which is oxygen in case of metal oxides or acetylene in case of metal carbides. When the thermodynamic conditions are met, the vapors react with the gas in the vicinity of the substrate to form films. Metal carbide films can also be deposited by co-evaporation. In this process, two ingots are used, one for metal and the other for carbon. Each ingot is heated with a different beam energy so that their evaporation rate can be controlled. As the vapors arrive at the surface, they chemically combine under proper thermodynamic conditions to form a metal carbide film.

== Substrate ==
The substrate on which the film deposition takes place is ultrasonically cleaned and fastened to the substrate holder. The substrate holder is attached to the manipulator shaft. The manipulator shaft moves translationally to adjust the distance between the ingot source and the substrate. The shaft also rotates the substrate at a particular speed so that the film is uniformly deposited on the substrate. A negative bias DC voltage of 200–400 V can be applied to the substrate. Often, focused high-energy electrons from one of the electron guns or infrared light from heater lamps is used to preheat the substrate. Heating of the substrate allows increased adatom–substrate and adatom–film diffusion by giving the adatoms sufficient energy to overcome kinetic barriers. If a rough film, such as metallic nanorods, is desired substrate cooling with water or liquid nitrogen may be employed to reduce diffusion lifetime, positively bolstering surface kinetic barriers. To further enhance film roughness, the substrate may be mounted at a steep angle with respect to the flux to achieve geometric shadowing, where incoming line of sight flux lands onto only higher parts of the developing film. This method is known as glancing-angle deposition (GLAD) or oblique-angle deposition (OAD).

== Ion-beam-assisted deposition ==
EBPVD systems are equipped with ion sources. These ion sources are used for substrate etching and cleaning, sputtering the target and controlling the microstructure of the substrate. The ion beams bombard the surface and alter the microstructure of the film. When the deposition reaction takes place on the hot substrate surface, the films can develop an internal tensile stress due to the mismatch in the coefficient of thermal expansion between the substrate and the film. High-energy ions can be used to bombard these ceramic thermal barrier coatings and change the tensile stress into compressive stress. Ion bombardment also increases the density of the film, changes the grain size and modifies amorphous films to polycrystalline films. Low-energy ions are used for the surfaces of semiconductor films.

== Advantages ==
The deposition rate in this process can be as low as 1 nm per minute to as high as few micrometers per minute. The material utilization efficiency is high relative to other methods, and the process offers structural and morphological control of films. Due to the very high deposition rate, this process has potential industrial application for wear-resistant and thermal barrier coatings in aerospace industries, hard coatings for cutting and tool industries, and electronic and optical films for semiconductor industries and thin-film solar applications.

== Disadvantages ==
EBPVD is a line-of-sight deposition process when performed at a low enough pressure (roughly <10^{−4} Torr ). The translational and rotational motion of the shaft helps for coating the outer surface of complex geometries, but this process cannot be used to coat the inner surface of complex geometries. Another potential problem is that filament degradation in the electron gun results in a non-uniform evaporation rate.

However, when vapor deposition is performed at pressures of roughly 10^{−4} Torr (1.3×10^{−4} hPa) or higher, significant scattering of the vapor cloud takes place such that surfaces not in sight of the source can be coated. Strictly speaking, the slow transition from line-of-sight to scattered deposition is determined not only by pressure (or mean free path) but also by source-to-substrate distance.

Certain materials are not well-suited to evaporation by EBPVD. The following reference materials suggest appropriate evaporation techniques for many materials:

- Vacuum Engineering & Materials Co., Inc.
- Kurt J. Lesker Company.

Also see Oxford's Evaporation Guide for the Elements.

== See also ==
- Electron-beam technology
