= Thermal barrier coating =

Form of exhaust heat management

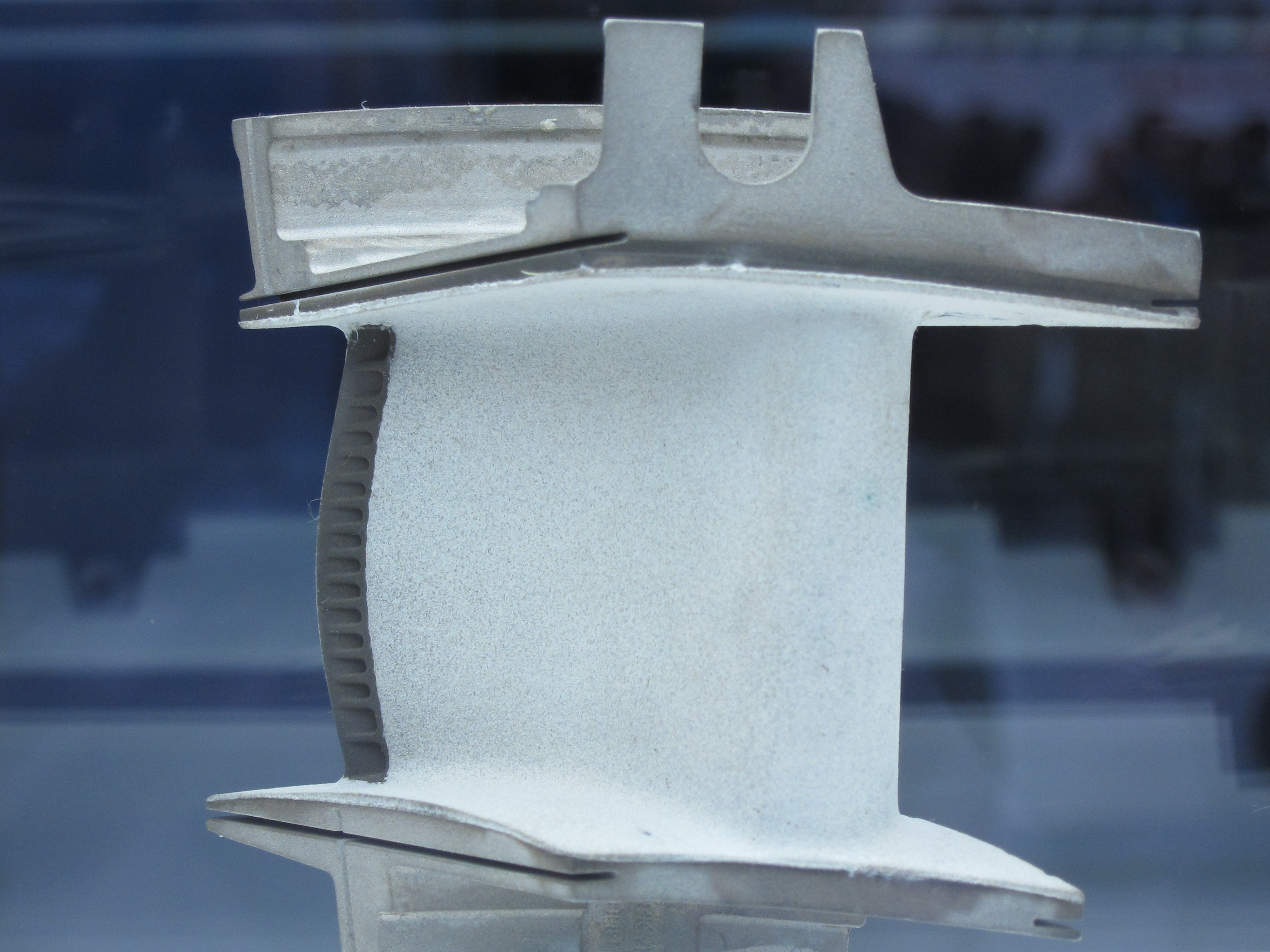
Thermal barrier coating (colored white) on a turbine guide vane in a V2500 turbofan engine

Thermal barrier coatings (TBCs) are advanced materials systems usually applied to metallic surfaces on parts operating at elevated temperatures, such as gas turbine combustors and turbines, and in automotive exhaust heat management. These 100 μm to 2 mm thick coatings of thermally insulating materials serve to insulate components from large and prolonged heat loads and can sustain an appreciable temperature difference between the load-bearing alloys and the coating surface. In doing so, these coatings can allow for higher operating temperatures while limiting the thermal exposure of structural components, extending part life by reducing oxidation and thermal fatigue. In conjunction with active film cooling, TBCs permit working fluid temperatures higher than the melting point of the metal airfoil in some turbine applications. Due to increasing demand for more efficient engines running at higher temperatures with better durability/lifetime and thinner coatings to reduce parasitic mass for rotating/moving components, there is significant motivation to develop new and advanced TBCs. The material requirements of TBCs are similar to those of heat shields, although in the latter application emissivity tends to be of greater importance.

== Structure ==
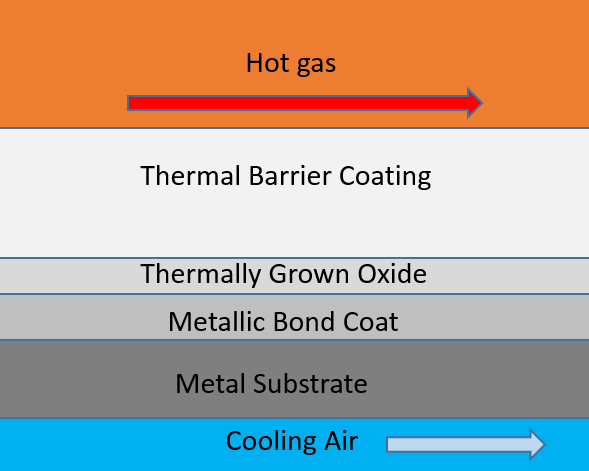
TBC and associated layers. Cooling air is often flowed through the metal substrate to enhance cooling.

An effective TBC needs to meet certain requirements to perform well in aggressive thermo-mechanical environments. To deal with thermal expansion stresses during heating and cooling, adequate porosity is needed, as well as appropriate matching of thermal expansion coefficients with the metal surface that the TBC is coating. Phase stability is required to prevent significant volume changes (which occur during phase changes), which would cause the coating to crack or spall. In air-breathing engines, oxidation resistance is necessary, as well as decent mechanical properties for rotating/moving parts or parts in contact. Therefore, general requirements for an effective TBC can be summarized as needing: 1) a high melting point. 2) no phase transformation between room temperature and operating temperature. 3) low thermal conductivity. 4) chemical inertness. 5) similar thermal expansion match with the metallic substrate. 6) good adherence to the substrate. 7) low sintering rate for a porous microstructure. These requirements severely limit the number of materials that can be used, with ceramic materials usually being able to satisfy the required properties.

Thermal barrier coatings typically consist of four layers: the metal substrate, metallic bond coat, thermally-grown oxide (TGO), and ceramic topcoat. The ceramic topcoat is typically composed of yttria-stabilized zirconia (YSZ), which has very low conductivity while remaining stable at the nominal operating temperatures typically seen in TBC applications. This ceramic layer creates the largest thermal gradient of the TBC and keeps the lower layers at a lower temperature than the surface. However, above 1200 °C, YSZ suffers from unfavorable phase transformations, changing from t'-tetragonal to tetragonal to cubic to monoclinic. Such phase transformations lead to crack formation within the top coating. Recent efforts to develop an alternative to the YSZ ceramic topcoat have identified many novel ceramics (e.g., rare earth zirconates) exhibiting superior performance at temperatures above 1200 °C, but with inferior fracture toughness compared to that of YSZ. In addition, such zirconates may have a high concentration of oxygen-ion vacancies, which may facilitate oxygen transport and exacerbate the formation of the TGO. With a thick enough TGO, spalling of the coating may occur, which is a catastrophic mode of failure for TBCs. The use of such coatings would require additional coatings that are more oxidation resistant, such as alumina or mullite.

The bond coat is an oxidation-resistant metallic layer which is deposited directly on top of the metal substrate. It is typically 75-150 μm thick and made of a NiCrAlY or NiCoCrAlY alloy, though other bond coats made of Ni and Pt aluminides also exist. The primary purpose of the bond coat is to protect the metal substrate from oxidation and corrosion, particularly from oxygen and corrosive elements that pass through the porous ceramic top coat.

At peak operating conditions found in gas-turbine engines with temperatures in excess of 700 °C, oxidation of the bond-coat leads to the formation of a thermally-grown oxide (TGO) layer. Formation of the TGO layer is inevitable for many high-temperature applications, so thermal barrier coatings are often designed so that the TGO layer grows slowly and uniformly. Such a TGO will have a structure that has a low diffusivity for oxygen, so that further growth is controlled by diffusion of metal from the bond-coat rather than the diffusion of oxygen from the top-coat.

The TBC can also be locally modified at the interface between the bond coat and the thermally grown oxide so that it acts as a thermographic phosphor, which allows for remote temperature measurement.

== Failure mechanisms ==
In general, failure mechanisms of TBCs are very complex and can vary significantly from TBC to TBC and depending on the environment in which the thermal cycling takes place. For this reason, the failure mechanisms are still not yet fully understood. Despite this multitude of failure mechanisms and their complexity, though, three of the most important failure mechanisms have to do with the growth of the thermally-grown oxide (TGO) layer, thermal shock, and sintering of the top coat (TC), discussed below. Additional factors contributing to failure of TBCs include mechanical rumpling of the bond coat during thermal cyclic exposure (especially coatings in aircraft engines), accelerated oxidation at high temperatures, hot corrosion, and molten deposit degradation.

=== TGO layer growth ===
The growth of the thermally-grown oxide (TGO) layer is the most important cause of TBC spallation failure. When the TGO forms as the TBC is heated, it causes a compressive growth stress associated with volume expansion. When it is cooled, a lattice mismatch strain arises between TGO and the top coat (TC) due to differing thermal expansion coefficients. Lattice mismatch strain refers to the strain that comes about when two crystalline lattices at an interface have different lattice constants and must nonetheless match one another where they meet at the interface. These growth stresses and lattice mismatch stresses, which increase with increasing cycling number, lead to plastic deformation, crack nucleation, and crack propagation, ultimately contributing to TBC failure after many cycles of heating and cooling. For this reason, in order to make a TBC that lasts a long time before failure, the thermal expansion coefficients between all layers should match well. Whereas a high BC creep rate increases the tensile stresses present in the TC due to TGO growth, a high TGO creep rate actually decreases these tensile stresses.

Because the TGO is made of Al_{2}O_{3}, and the metallic bond coat (BC) is normally made of an aluminum-containing alloy, TGO formation tends to deplete the Al in the bond coat. If the BC runs out of aluminum to supply to the growing TGO, it's possible for compounds other than Al_{2}O_{3} to enter the TGO (such as Y_{2}O_{3}, for example), which weakens the TGO, making it easier for the TBC to fail.

=== Thermal shock ===
Because the purpose of TBCs is to insulate metallic substrates such that they can be used for prolonged times at high temperatures, they often undergo thermal shock, which is a stress that arises in a material when it undergoes a rapid temperature change. This thermal shock is a major contributor to the failure of TBCs, since the thermal shock stresses can cause cracking in the TBC if they are sufficiently strong. In fact, the repeated thermal shocks associated with turning the engine on and off many times is a main contributor to failure of TBC-coated turbine blades in airplanes.

Over the course of repeated cycles of rapid heating and cooling, thermal shock leads to significant tensile strains perpendicular to the interface between the BC and the TC, reaching a maximum magnitude at the BC/TC interface, as well as a periodic strain field in the direction parallel to the BC/TC interface. Especially after many cycles of heating and cooling, these strains can lead to nucleation and propagation of cracks both parallel and perpendicular to the BC/TC interface. These linked-up horizontal and vertical cracks due to thermal shock ultimately contribute to the failure of the TBC via delamination of the TC.

=== Sintering ===
A third major contributor to TBC failure is sintering of the TC. In TBC applications, YSZ has a columnar structure. These columns start out with a feathery structure, but become smoother with heating due to atomic diffusion at high temperature in order to minimize surface energy. The undulations on adjacent smoother columns eventually touch one another and begin to coalesce. As the YSZ sinters and becomes more dense in this fashion, it shrinks in size, leading to the formation of cracks via a mechanism analogous to the formation of mudcracks, where the top layer shrinks but the bottom layer (the BC in the case of TBCs, or the earth in the case of mud) remains the same size.

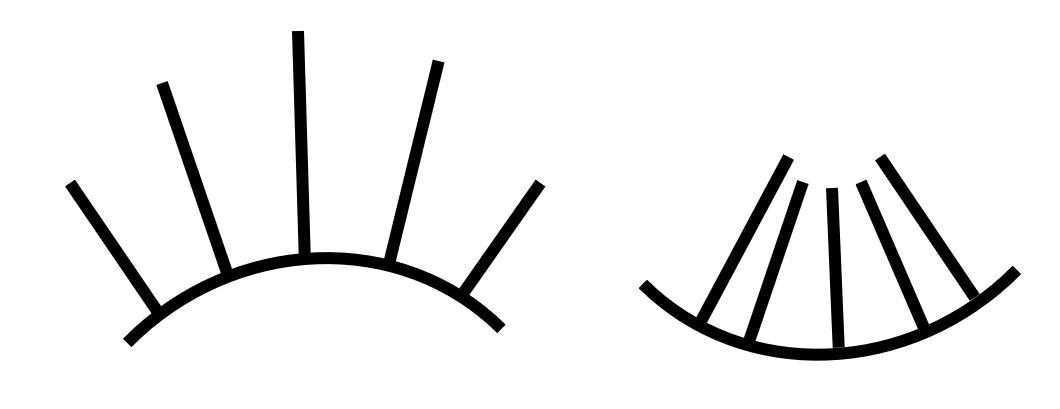
Observe that if columns are placed on a curved surface, normal to that surface, then column density will necessarily be high above valleys in the surface and low above peaks in the surface due to the tilting of the straight rods.

This mud-cracking effect can be exacerbated if the underlying substrate is rough, or if it roughens upon heating, for the following reason. If the surface under the columns is curvy and if the columns can be modeled as straight rods normal to the surface underneath them, then column density will necessarily be high above valleys in the surface and low above peaks in the surface due to the tilting of the straight rods. This leads to a non-uniform columnar density throughout the TBC and promotes crack development in low-density regions.

In addition to this mud-cracking effect, sintering increases the Young's modulus of the TC as the columns become attached to one another. This in turn increases the lattice mismatch strain at the interface between the TC and BC or TGO. The TC's increased Young's modulus makes it more difficult for its lattice to bend to meet that of the substrate under it; this is the origin of the increased lattice mismatch strain. In turn, this increased mismatch strain adds with the other previously mentioned strain fields in the TC to promote crack formation and propagation, leading to failure of the TBC.

== Types ==
=== YSZ ===
YSZ is the most widely studied and used TBC because it provides excellent performance in applications such as diesel engines and gas turbines. Additionally, it was one of the few refractory oxides that could be deposited as thick films using the then-known technology of plasma spraying. As for properties, it has low thermal conductivity, high thermal expansion coefficient, and low thermal shock resistance. However, it has a fairly low operating limit of 1200 °C due to phase instability, and can corrode due to its oxygen transparency.

=== Mullite ===
Mullite is a compound of alumina and silica, with the formula 3Al_{2}O_{3}-2SiO_{2}. It has a low density, along with good mechanical properties, high thermal stability, low thermal conductivity, and is corrosion and oxidation resistant. However, it suffers from crystallization and volume contraction above 800 °C, which leads to cracking and delamination. Therefore, this material is suitable as a zirconia alternative for applications such as diesel engines, where surface temperatures are relatively low and temperature variations across the coating may be large.

=== Alumina ===
Only α-phase Al_{2}O_{3} is stable among aluminum oxides. With a high hardness and chemical inertness, but high thermal conductivity and low thermal expansion coefficient, alumina is often used as an addition to an existing TBC coating. By incorporating alumina in YSZ TBC, oxidation and corrosion resistance can be improved, as well as hardness and bond strength without significant change in the elastic modulus or toughness. One challenge with alumina is applying the coating through plasma spraying, which tends to create a variety of unstable phases, such as γ-alumina. When these phases eventually transform into the stable α-phase through thermal cycling, a significant volume change of ~15% (γ to α) follows, which can lead to microcrack formation in the coating.

=== CeO_{2} + YSZ ===
CeO_{2} (Ceria) has a higher thermal expansion coefficient and lower thermal conductivity than YSZ. Adding ceria into a YSZ coating can significantly improve the TBC performance, especially in thermal shock resistance. This is most likely due to less bond coat stress due to better insulation and a better net thermal expansion coefficient. Some negative effects of the addition of ceria include the decrease of hardness and accelerated rate of sintering of the coating (less porous).

=== Rare-earth zirconates ===
La_{2}Zr_{2}O_{7}, also referred to as LZ, is an example of a rare-earth zirconate that shows potential for use as a TBC. This material is phase stable up to its melting point and can largely tolerate vacancies on any of its sublattices. Along with the ability for site-substitution with other elements, this means that thermal properties can potentially be tailored. Although it has a very low thermal conductivity compared to YSZ, it also has a low thermal expansion coefficient and low toughness.

=== Rare earth oxides ===
Single and mixed phase materials consisting of rare earth oxides represent a promising low-cost approach towards TBCs. Coatings of rare earth oxides (e.g.: La_{2}O_{3}, Nb_{2}O_{5}, Pr_{2}O_{3}, CeO_{2} as main phases) have lower thermal conductivity and higher thermal expansion coefficients when compared to YSZ. The main challenge to overcome is the polymorphic nature of most rare earth oxides at elevated temperatures, as phase instability tends to negatively impact thermal shock resistance. Another advantage of rare earth oxides as TBCs is their tendency to exhibit intrinsic hydrophobicity, which provides various advantages for systems that undergo intermittent use and may otherwise suffer from moisture adsorption or surface ice formation.

=== Metal-glass composites ===
A powder mixture of metal and normal glass can be plasma-sprayed in vacuum, with a suitable composition resulting in a TBC comparable to YSZ. Additionally, metal-glass composites have superior bond-coat adherence, higher thermal expansion coefficients, and no open porosity, which prevents oxidation of the bond-coat.

== Uses ==
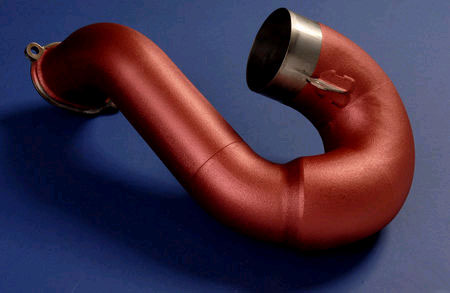
Thermal barrier coating on an automotive exhaust system component

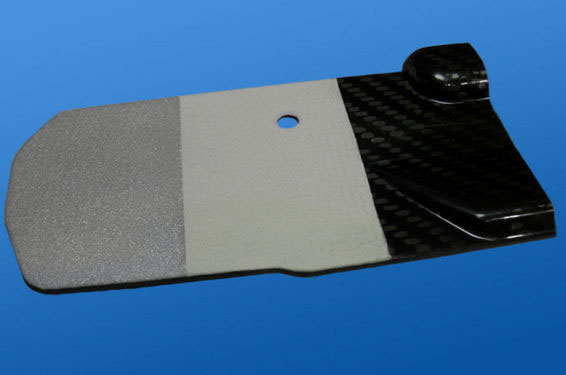
Thermal barrier coating on a carbon composite material

=== Automotive ===
Thermal barrier ceramic coatings are becoming more common in automotive applications. They are specifically designed to reduce heat loss from engine exhaust system components including exhaust manifolds, turbocharger casings, exhaust headers, downpipes and tailpipes. This process is also known as "exhaust heat management". When used under-bonnet, these have the positive effect of reducing engine bay temperatures, therefore reducing the intake air temperature.

Although most ceramic coatings are applied to metallic parts directly related to the engine exhaust system, technological advances now allow thermal barrier coatings to be applied via plasma spray onto composite materials. It is now commonplace to find ceramic-coated components in modern engines and on high-performance components in race series such as Formula 1. As well as providing thermal protection, these coatings are also used to prevent physical degradation of the composite material due to friction. This is possible because the ceramic material bonds with the composite (instead of merely sticking on the surface with paint), thereby forming a tough coating that doesn't chip or flake easily.

Although thermal barrier coatings have been applied to the insides of exhaust system components, problems have been encountered because of the difficulty in preparing the internal surface prior to coating.

=== Aviation ===
Thermal barrier coatings are commonly used to protect nickel-based superalloys from both melting and thermal cycling in aviation turbines. Combined with cool air flow, TBCs increase the allowable gas temperature above that of the superalloy melting point.

To avoid the difficulties associated with the melting point of superalloys, many researchers are investigating ceramic-matrix composites (CMCs) as high-temperature alternatives. Generally, these are made from fiber-reinforced SiC. Rotating parts are especially good candidates for the material change due to the enormous fatigue that they endure. Not only do CMCs have better thermal properties, but they are also lighter meaning that less fuel would be needed to produce the same thrust for the lighter aircraft. The material change is, however, not without consequences. At high temperatures, these CMCs are reactive with water and form gaseous silicon hydroxide compounds that corrode the CMC.

SiOH_{2} + H_{2}O = SiO(OH)_{2}

SiOH_{2} + 2H_{2}O = Si(OH)_{4}

2SiOH_{2} + 3H_{2}O = Si_{2}O(OH)_{6}

The thermodynamic data for these reactions has been experimentally determined over many years to determine that Si(OH)_{4} is generally the dominant vapor species. Even more advanced environmental barrier coatings are required to protect these CMCs from water vapor as well as other environmental degradants. For instance, as the gas temperatures increase towards 1400 K-1500 K, sand particles begin to melt and react with coatings. The melted sand is generally a mixture of calcium oxide, magnesium oxide, aluminum oxide, and silicon oxide (commonly referred to as CMAS). Many research groups are investigating the harmful effects of CMAS on turbine coatings and how to prevent damage. CMAS is a large barrier to increasing the combustion temperature of gas turbine engines and will need to be solved before turbines see a large increase in efficiency from temperature increase.

== Processing ==
In industry, thermal barrier coatings are produced in a number of ways:

- Electron beam physical vapor deposition: EBPVD
- Air plasma spray: APS
- High velocity oxygen fuel: HVOF
- Electrostatic spray-assisted vapor deposition: ESAVD
- Direct vapor deposition

Additionally, the development of advanced coatings and processing methods is a field of active research. One such example is the solution precursor plasma spray process, which has been used to create TBCs with some of the lowest reported thermal conductivities without sacrificing thermal cyclic durability.

== See also ==
- Piezospectroscopy
- Thermal spraying
- Zircotec
