= Ram Seshadri =

American materials scientist and academic

- Born: India
- Citizenship: American
- Occupations: Materials scientist and academic

Academic background
- Education: Delhi University; Indian Institute of Science
- Thesis: Investigations on Fullerenes, Carbon Nanotubes, Onions and Small Gold Particles (1995)

Academic work
- Institutions: University of California, Santa Barbara

Ram Seshadri is an American materials scientist, chemist and academic. He is the associate dean for research in the College of Engineering as well as distinguished professor in the Materials Department and the Department of Chemistry and Biochemistry, and the Fred and Linda R. Wudl Professor of Materials Science at University of California, Santa Barbara.

Seshadri is known for his contributions to understanding the relationships between structure, composition, and properties in functional inorganic materials. His research also encompasses materials for energy conversion and storage, such as Li-ion and related battery materials, magnetocaloric materials, and hybrid halide optoelectronic materials. Furthermore, he is the recipient of 2004 National Science Foundation Career Award, and the 2005 ExxonMobil Solid State Chemistry Faculty Fellowship of the American Chemical Society. Furthermore, he has published over 400 scientific research publications in leading academic journals.

Seshadri has served on the editorial boards of numerous academic journals and is the editor of the journal Annual Review of Materials Research.

== Academic background ==
Seshadri completed his Bachelor's in Chemistry from St. Stephen's College at Delhi University in 1989. Later, he earned his M.S. in chemistry, followed by a Ph.D. under the supervision of professor C. N. R. Rao in Solid State Chemistry, from the Indian Institute of Science, in 1995.

== Career ==
Seshadri began his academic career in 1999 as an assistant professor in the Solid State and Structural Chemistry Unit at the Indian Institute of Science. From 2002 to 2006, he was an assistant professor in the Materials Department at the University of California, Santa Barbara. In 2006, he was promoted to associate professor in the Department of Chemistry and Biochemistry, serving until 2008. He then became a professor in the Materials Department and the Department of Chemistry and Biochemistry at the same institution. Furthermore, he is a fellow of Royal Society of Chemistry, American Association for the Advancement of Science, American Physical Society and the Neutron Scattering Society of America. Since 2020, he has served as a distinguished professor in the Materials Department and the Department of Chemistry and Biochemistry, as well as the associate dean for research in the College of Engineering at the University of California, Santa Barbara.

== Awards and honors ==
- 2004 – Career Award, National Science Foundation
- 2005 – ExxonMobil Solid State Chemistry Faculty Fellowship, American Chemical Society
- 2015 – Silver Medal, Chemical Research Society of India
- 2018 – Silver Medal, Materials Research Society of India
