= Elton N. Kaufmann =

American materials scientist

- Born: 1943 (age 81–82); Cleveland, OH
- Citizenship: US
- Education: Rensselaer Polytechnic Institute; California Institute of Technology
- Partner(s): Diane née Smith; Adeline J. Thomas
- Scientific career
- Institutions: Bell Labs; Lawrence Livermore National Laboratory; Argonne National Laboratory

Elton Neil Kaufmann (born 1943) is an American materials scientist. He is known for his work investigating hyperfine interactions with nuclear spectroscopic methods and the interactions between particles and solids. His career was spent at Bell Labs, Lawrence Livermore National Laboratory, and Argonne National Laboratory; he served as editor of Hyperfine Interactions, Methods in Materials Research, and the Annual Review of Materials Research.

== Early life and education ==
Elton Neil Kaufmann was born in 1943 in Cleveland, Ohio to Phillip H. Kaufmann and his wife. Kaufmann graduated from Rensselaer Polytechnic Institute with his bachelor's degree physics in 1964. He then attended California Institute of Technology under the advisorship of Felix Boehm, graduating with his PhD in physics in 1968.

== Career ==
He is known for his work investigating hyperfine interactions with nuclear spectroscopic methods and the interactions between particles and solids. He first worked for Bell Labs after finishing his PhD and was employed there from 1968 through 1981. He researched the properties of materials using methods like hyperfine interactions, laser-solid interactions, and ion-solid interactions. In 1981 he joined the staff of the Lawrence Livermore National Laboratory, becoming the leader of their Materials Division in 1986.

In 1989 he began working at Argonne National Laboratory, where he is currently an emeritus scientist. He has been the editor of several academic journals, including Hyperfine Interactions, Methods in Materials Research, and the Annual Review of Materials Research. He was also the editor of the text Characterization of Materials, which is considered "a leading reference guide to any researcher working on materials systems".

== Awards and honors ==
Kaufmann served as the president of the Materials Research Society in 1985. He was elected as a fellow of the American Physical Society in 1988 for "development and application of a broad range of techniques such as nuclear and electron resonance spectroscopies and ion beam analysis to fundamental studies in materials science."

== Personal life ==
He married Diane née Smith in 1964. He later married Adeline J. Thomas in 1988. Kaufmann has been interested in photography since 1985. He has self-published several books of his photography, which feature monochrome photographs. Some of his work can be found at www.cycloid-fathom.com and his personal essays include those at cycloid.substack.com.
