= Annual Review of Materials Research =

- Discipline: Materials science
- Language: English
- Edited by: Ram Seshadri

Publication details
- Former name: Annual Review of Materials Science (1971–2000)
- History: 1971–present, 55 years old
- Publisher: Annual Reviews (US)
- Frequency: Annually
- Open access: Subscribe to Open
- Impact factor: 14.6 (2025)

Standard abbreviations
- ISO 4: Annu. Rev. Mater. Res.

Indexing
- CODEN: ARMSCX
- ISSN: 0084-6600 (print); 1545-4118 (web)
- LCCN: 75172108
- OCLC no.: 66548704

Links
- Journal homepage

The Annual Review of Materials Research is a peer-reviewed journal that publishes review articles about materials science. It has been published by Annual Reviews (AR) since 1971, when it was first released under the title the Annual Review of Materials Science. Four people have served as editors, with the current editor Ram Seshadri stepping into the position in 2024. As of 2023, it is being published as open access, under the Subscribe to Open model. As of 2026, Journal Citation Reports gives the journal a 2025 impact factor of 14.6.

== History ==
The Annual Review of Materials Science first appeared in 1971, making it the sixteenth title to be published by Annual Reviews (AR), a nonprofit organization whose stated mission is to synthesize knowledge "for the progress of science and the benefit of society." The journal's first editor was Robert Huggins.

In 2001, its name was changed to the current form, the Annual Review of Materials Research. The name change was intended "to better reflect the broad appeal that materials research has for so many diverse groups of scientists and not simply those who identify themselves with the academic discipline of materials science." As of 2020, it was published both in print and electronically.

It defines its scope as covering significant developments in the field of materials science, including methodologies for studying materials and materials phenomena. As of 2026, Journal Citation Reports gives the journal a 2025 impact factor of 14.6 ranking it 43rd of 472 titles in the category "Materials Science, Multidisciplinary". It is abstracted and indexed in Scopus, Science Citation Index Expanded, Civil Engineering Abstracts, INSPEC, and Academic Search, among others.

== Editorial processes ==
The Annual Review of Materials Research is helmed by the editor or the co-editors. The editor is assisted by the editorial committee, which includes associate editors, regular members, and occasionally guest editors. Guest members participate at the invitation of the editor, and serve terms of one year. All other members of the editorial committee are appointed by the AR board of directors and serve five-year terms. The editorial committee determines which topics should be included in each volume and solicits reviews from qualified authors. Unsolicited manuscripts are not accepted. Peer review of accepted manuscripts is undertaken by the editorial committee.

=== Editors of volumes ===
Dates indicate publication years in which someone was credited as a lead editor or co-editor of a journal volume. The planning process for a volume begins well before the volume appears, so appointment to the position of lead editor generally occurred prior to the first year shown here. An editor who has retired or died may be credited as a lead editor of a volume that they helped to plan, even if it is published after their retirement or death.

- Robert Huggins (1971–1993)
- Elton N. Kaufmann (1994–2000)
- David R. Clarke (2001–2024)
- Ram Seshadri (2025-)

=== Current editorial committee ===
As of 2024, the editorial committee consists of the editor and the following members:

- Don Lipkin
- Vikram Jayaram
- Wayne D. Kaplan
- Christine Luscombe
- Yang Shen

== See also ==
- List of materials science journals
