= Exhaust heat management =

Exhaust heat management is the means of lessening the damaging or performance-robbing effects of internal combustion engine exhaust heat by preventing heat from escaping from the exhaust system and into the engine compartment on automobiles.

== Overview ==
The fact that exhausts often pass near important components means that ways of protecting these components from heat soak are especially important. As a result, heat management is used as a way of reflecting, dissipating or simply absorbing the heat.

Heat shield is also useful to reduce under-hood temperatures which therefore reduces intake temperature, subsequently increasing power.

== Types ==
There are many different types of heat management, some more effective than others. They range from basic solid heat shield to plasma sprayed ceramics.

=== Heat shield ===
Heat shield is one of the most widely used heat management options available due to its relative low price and ease to fit. In the past it has usually been custom made from rigid steel; however, flexible aluminium is now the standard. The key difference between a heat shield and insulating the pipe, through either wrapping or thermal coating, is the air gap that exists between the exhaust and the shield.

More recently technology has become available to apply ceramic thermal barrier coatings onto flexible aluminium in order to increase the thermal insulatory properties. This same procedure is also used on composite materials, which is often used on high-performance race cars, such as in Formula 1.

=== Ceramic paint ===
This fairly low-cost solution can offer minor reductions in heat loss. It is often applied by brushing or spraying from an aerosol onto the exhaust system, followed by curing in the oven to allow the paint to adhere. This is sometimes applied to the internal surfaces of the exhaust. However, this often flakes prematurely due to the inability to clean the surface prior to application. It is usually necessary to reapply every 1–2 years due to it flaking and peeling.

=== Thermal barrier coating ===
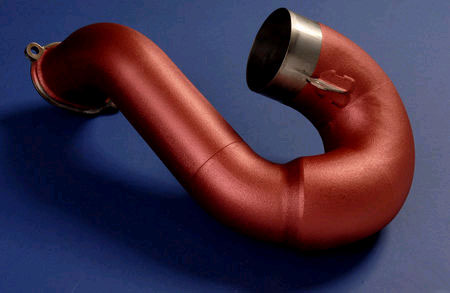
Coloured ceramic thermal barrier coating on exhaust component

These ceramic coatings are highly advanced coatings applied via plasma spray, and as a result, the coating is effectively welded to the surface of the exhaust system. They can offer small performance benefits due to the low thermal conductivity of the ceramic compound. This reduces engine bay temperature and increases exhaust velocity. These coatings protect steel exhaust systems further by protecting from rust.

=== Heat wrap ===
This is the cheapest solution and is quite easy to apply. Exhaust heat wrapping has been used for many years to improve performance and avoid burns from motorcycle exhausts. Heat wrap consists of a high-temperature synthetic fabric which is wrapped around the manifold. Often sold as a cheap and easy way to boost horsepower, exhaust wrap does not increase engine output much. It can decrease engine bay temperatures and increase exhaust velocity. Lower intake air temperature — and therefore increased air density — may result in an increase in engine efficiency and power. Hotter exhaust gases travel faster which may reduce turbo lag and improve exhaust gas scavenging.

There has been much debate if heat wrap is better than plasma-sprayed coatings. The far cheaper option in the short term is heat wrap being quick and easy to apply. Heat wraps are more fragile and can absorb oil and water. Ceramic plasma-sprayed coatings also have similar performance benefits and whilst being quite expensive and requiring professional application, they last a long time and protect non stainless steel manifolds from rust.

== See also ==
- Thermal spraying
- Zircotec
