= Piezospectroscopy =

Analytical technique

Piezospectroscopy (also known as photoluminescence piezospectroscopy) is an analytical technique that reveals internal stresses in alumina-containing materials, particularly thermal barrier coatings (TBCs). A typical procedure involves illuminating the sample with laser light of a known wavelength, causing the material to release its own radiation in response (see fluorescence). By measuring the emitted radiation and comparing the location of the peaks to a stress-free sample, stresses in the material can be revealed without any destructive interaction.

Piezospectroscopy can be used on any material that exhibits fluorescence, but is almost exclusively used on samples containing alumina because of the presence of chromium ions, either as part of the composition or as an impurity, that greatly increase the fluorescent response. As opposed to other methods of stress measurement, such as powder diffraction or the use of a strain gauge, piezospectroscopy can measure internal stresses at higher resolution, on the order of 1 μm, and can measure very quickly, with most systems taking less than one second to acquire data.

== Theory ==
Piezospectroscopy takes advantage of both the microstructure and composition of TBCs to generate accurate results.

A typical candidate for piezospectroscopy contains three layers:

- Ceramic topcoat – A thick, highly porous layer, usually composed of yttria-stabilized zirconia (YSZ), which displays low thermal conductivity and stability at high operating temperatures
- Thermally grown oxide (TGO) – A thin layer that results from oxidation of the bond coat. Because oxidation is inevitable at high temperatures, the goal of an effective TBC is slow and uniform growth of an oxide.
- Metallic bond coat – A metallic layer directly above the substrate intended to prevent corrosion and oxidation

Coating failure is usually a result of spalling or cracking of the TGO layer. Because the TGO is buried beneath a thick layer of ceramic, subsurface stresses are generally difficult to detect. The use of an argon-ion laser makes this possible. The optical band gap (threshold for photon absorption) of the ceramic topcoat is much greater than the energy of argon laser light, effectively making the topcoat translucent and allowing for interaction with the TGO layer. Within the TGO, it is the chromium (Cr^{3+}) ions that produce strong emission spectra and allow for piezospectroscopic analysis.

At the subatomic level, the laser light of known wavelength (usually 5149 Å) causes the outer electron in the Cr^{3+} ions to absorb the incoming radiation, which raises it to a higher energy level. Upon returning to a lower energy state, the electron releases its own radiation. Because the energy levels are discrete, the spectrum for stress-free aluminum oxide always exhibits two peaks at wavelengths 14,402 cm^{−1} and 14,432 cm^{−1}. The wavelength and frequency are related through:

$v = {c \over \lambda}$

where v is the frequency, λ is the wavelength, and c is the speed of light. If the coating is under a compressive stress, the peaks will be shifted downward while a tensile stress will shift them upward.

The frequency shift is given by the equation:

$\Delta v= {2 \over 3} \amalg_{ii} \sigma_{av}$

where $\amalg_{ii}$ is the piezospectroscopic tensor and $\sigma_{av}$ is the residual stress within the coating.

== Instrumentation ==
In order to obtain accurate results, a few finely tuned instruments must work in tandem:

=== Laser ===
A light source, such as a laser, is instrumental to piezospectroscopy. Narrow bandwidth lasers are preferred due to the increased resolution of the resulting spectrum. The fluorescent response is stronger at lower frequencies, but excessively low frequency light can cause sample degradation and interference with the ceramic surface of the coating.

=== Microscope ===
A microscope is generally used to isolate a certain section of a sample. Because TBC failure can begin at microscopic scales, magnification is often essential to accurately detect stresses.

=== Monochromator ===
A monochromator is used to filter out weakly scattered light and permit the strong emission peaks from the fluorescent response. In addition, notch or long-pass optical filters are used to filter the peak from the laser wavelength itself.

=== Detector ===
Many types of detectors are used with piezospectroscopy, the two most common being dispersion through a spectrograph or an interferometer. The resulting signal can be analyzed through Fourier Transform (FT) methods. Array detectors such as CCDs are also common, with many different types being suited for different ranges of wavelengths.

== Procedure ==
1. The laser beam is directed through a lens and focused on the sample
2. The reflected beam is sent through a set of filters, which remove signal noise and isolate the desired range of the signal
3. The filtered beam is once again focused through a lens and split into several beams with a diffraction grading
4. The diffracted signal is reflected onto a detector, which converts the optical information into digital samples that are sent to a computer for further analysis

== Applications ==
Piezospectroscopy is used in industry to ensure safe operation of TBCs.

=== Quality control ===
It is critical that TBCs be applied properly in order to prevent premature microfractures, delamination, and other structural failure. Through piezospectroscopy, parts can be put into service with the assurance of a properly protected substrate.

=== Nondestructive inspection/remaining lifetime assessment ===
Piezospectroscopy can accurately describe the extent of any discovered damage and provide accurate lifetime estimates in actual use. In addition, piezospectroscopy can be set up in situ. This, along with its noninvasive nature, makes piezospectroscopy an efficient method of onsite damage assessment.
