= Parasitic mass =

Transportation term

In a rocket, weapon, or transportation system (such as personal rapid transit), parasitic mass is the mass of all components of the system that are not considered payloads. A typical engineering objective is to drive the parasitic mass towards zero. Efficiency gains are achieved as the parasitic mass is reduced.
