= Zircotec =

Zircotec Ltd.
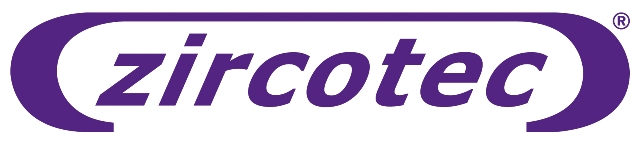
- Company type: Limited company
- Industry: Automotive Coatings; Industrial Coatings
- Headquarters: Abingdon, England
- Products: ThermoHold Coatings; ZircoFlex Heatshielding; ElectroHold Coatings
- Number of employees: 50–100

Zircotec is a high temperature coating and heat barrier manufacturer, based in Abingdon near Oxford, England. It uses plasma-sprayed ceramic materials to provide thermal and abrasive resistance to components – with a focus on automotive exhaust systems. Notable products include coloured thermal barrier coatings and ZircoFlex – a flexible ceramic heatshield.

== History ==
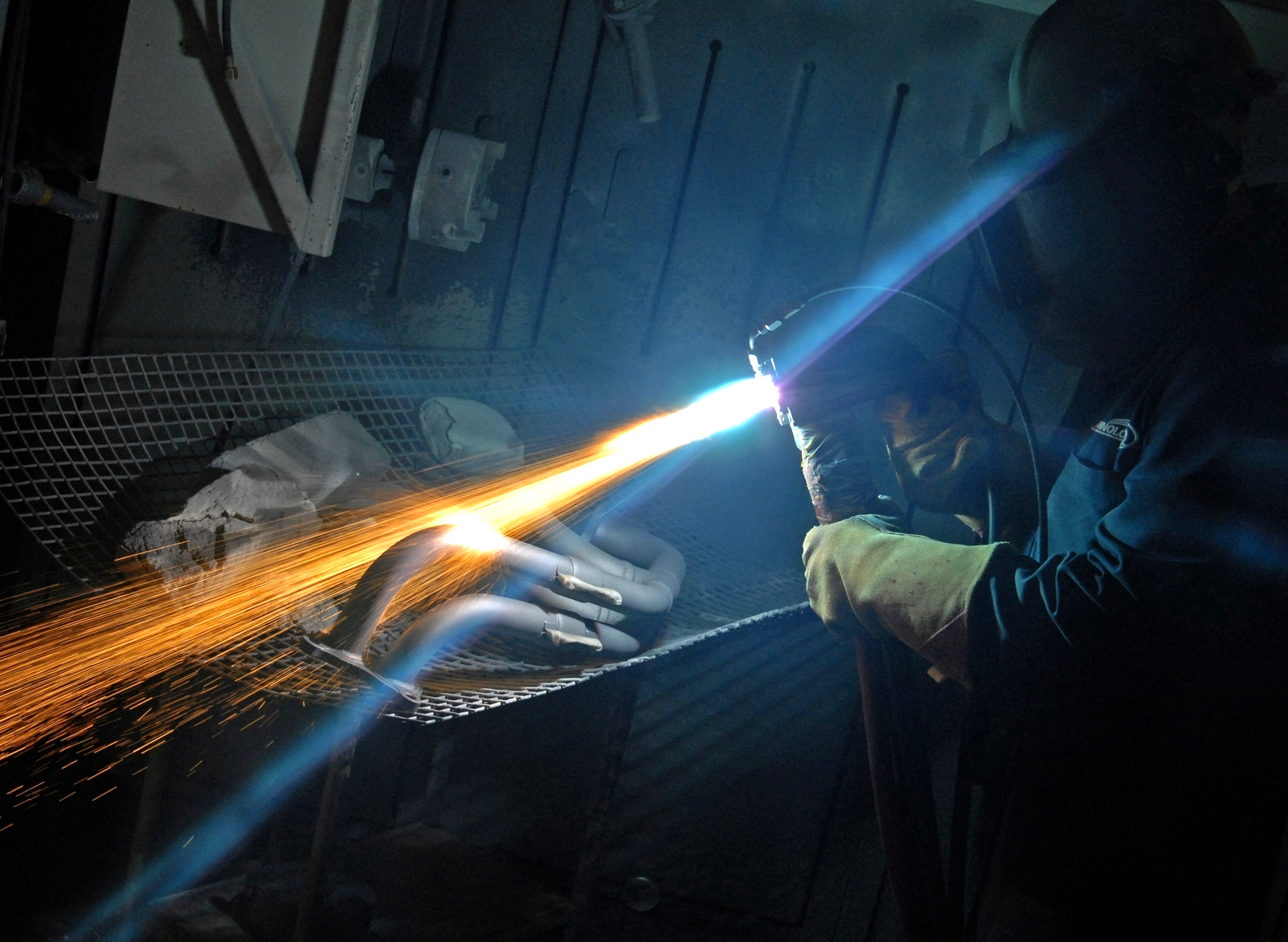
Zircotec plasma-spray process

=== 1960–2003: Development at UKAEA ===
Zircotec began life as part of the United Kingdom Atomic Energy Authority, where its high temperature coatings and heat barrier processes were originally developed for the nuclear industry. It was based at the Atomic Energy Research Establishment near Harwell, Oxfordshire. At the time, this was the main centre for atomic energy research and development in the United Kingdom.

In 1994, Zircotec's thermal barrier coatings were first used in a motorsport application. These coatings were applied to the exhaust systems of Subaru rally cars to lower in-cabin temperatures. After initial success, these high temperature coatings were then used on a variety of other vehicles, including Formula One cars and trucks.

=== 2003–2009: Foundation of Zircotec ===
Zircotec was bought by a venture capital fund in 2003. Subsequently, Zircotec shifted its focus from the nuclear industry, towards general industry and automotive applications. As a result, Zircotec developed Thermohold coatings for high performance automotive and classic car applications. Their main Thermohold coating was called Performance White, a white dual-layer plasma-sprayed ceramic.

In July 2007, Terry Graham was appointed as the new managing director. Later that year, Koenigsegg, a Swedish automaker, announced use of Zircotec’s coatings on its CCX supercar. Additionally, in October, Zircotec became involved in the world land speed steam-car record attempt, supplying its coatings for thermal protection of sensitive components – this attempt was successful a year later.

In June 2008, Zircotec developed a plasma-sprayed ceramic coating specifically for composite materials. Predominantly aimed at motorsport and high-performance car applications, coated composites could now function at temperatures above their melting points.

In September 2008, Zircotec launched its Performance Colours range. This range is based on Zircotec's Performance White coating, but has an additional coloured finish, offering a more robust and maintainable finish. Zircotec initially released thirteen different colours.

=== 2009–2019: Management buyout ===
Zircotec's directors completed a management buyout early in 2009.

In 2010, the company's headquarters were relocated to the nearby town of Abingdon, Oxfordshire. The move was completed to provide increased production capacity and to accommodate future business growth.

In 2011, Zircotec developed the world's first flexible ceramic heatshield, named Zircoflex.

In July 2019, Zircotec experienced a fire at its premises and temporarily relocated to a nearby facility.

=== 2019–present: Expansion ===
Zircotec announced an investment of £2.5m into a new 20,000 square foot premises in Abingdon which was completed by October 2019. This offers a ten-fold increase in capacity with a significant increase in workforce

In March 2021, the release of a new heatshield product – ZircoFlex SHIELD – was announced.

In June 2022, Zircotec procured a further 10,000 square foot building which will be dedicated to producing technology for low and zero carbon vehicles.

In 2024, Zircotec began leading the CeraBEV (Ceramics for Battery Electric Vehicles) project, a £1 million Advanced Propulsion Centre-funded collaboration with Cranfield University. The project aims to develop a single-layer ceramic coating that provides both dielectric insulation and flame resistance, enabling the use of lightweight materials such as aluminium and polymer composites in EV battery enclosures and cooling plates.

== Products ==
Zircotec develops thermal coatings and heat shielding materials for use in high-temperature environments.

=== Ceramic coatings ===
Zircotec’s ceramic coatings are applied using a plasma spray process, where powdered ceramic material is melted in a high-temperature flame and sprayed onto a surface at high speed. The coating forms a thin, solid ceramic layer that reduces heat transfer from components such as exhausts and manifolds. A typical coating includes a metallic bond coat and a ceramic top layer, with a total thickness of around 300–350 microns. These coatings can lower surface temperatures by up to 25–33%, depending on the formulation:

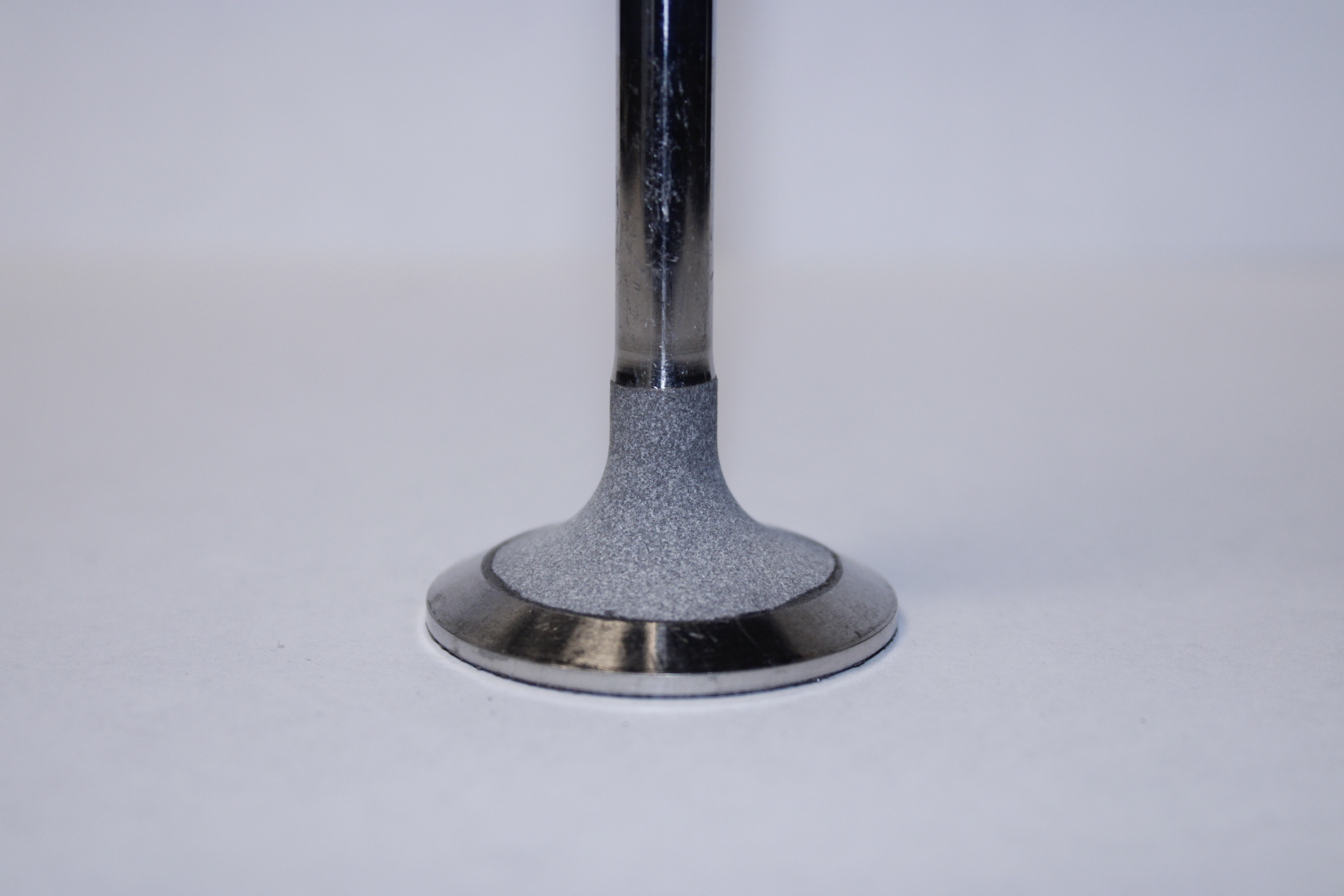
Ceramic coating on valve stem

- Primary Range – a cost-effective option with moderate thermal protection
- Performance White – a higher-grade ceramic for more demanding environments
- Performance Colours – the same as Performance White, but with a coloured finish for appearance and easier cleaning.

These coatings are used in motorsport, automotive, and industrial applications to protect heat-sensitive components and enable the use of lightweight materials near high-temperature zones.

=== Heat shielding ===
Zircotec’s flexible heat shields, branded as ZircoFlex, are thin, formable materials designed to provide thermal protection in confined or geometrically complex environments. The product combines a ceramic insulating layer with a metallic foil backing, allowing it to be bent, wrapped, or contoured without compromising its thermal performance. ZircoFlex products are available in single-, double-, and triple-layer formats to suit different performance requirements. They are typically used in underbody panels, transmission tunnels, engine compartments, and other areas requiring compact and lightweight thermal solutions.

The original ZircoFlex material was launched in 2011 as the first commercially available flexible ceramic heat shield. It has since been used in a variety of sectors including motorsport, automotive engineering, aerospace, and offshore engineering. For example, ZircoFlex was employed to address overheating issues on an isolated oil platform in the Caspian Sea, where it was applied to HVAC systems to protect against radiant heat from a flare stack.

ZircoFlex SHIELD, a multi-layered, metallic-encapsulated heat shield system is designed for higher thermal loads. This product offers increased thermal attenuation compared to previous versions and is suitable for use in applications with continuous operating temperatures up to 1000 °C.

=== Coatings for composites ===
Zircotec has developed plasma-sprayed ceramic coatings that enable fibre-reinforced polymers to withstand elevated temperatures, particularly in motorsport and high-performance applications.

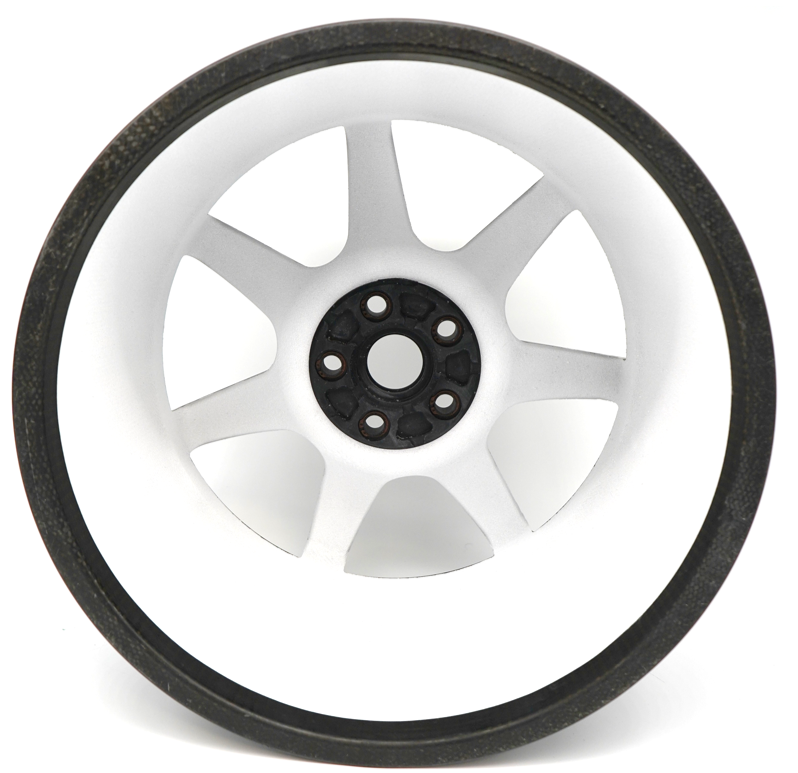
Carbon fibre wheel with zircotec thermal barrier coating

Its ThermoHold coating, first used in Formula One, was later applied to the Aston Martin One-77 to protect composite diffusers and intake ducts. The coating reduced surface temperatures by over 125 °C, enabling the use of lightweight materials near exhaust systems.

Zircotec also supplies ceramic thermal barrier coatings for CFRP wheels, particularly in motorsport and high-end road cars. The lightweight coating helps reduce heat transfer from brakes to the heat-sensitive rim, enabling the usage of CFRP.

=== EV thermal coatings ===
Zircotec develops ceramic-based thermal coatings for use in electric vehicle (EV) systems, with the aim of supporting thermal management, electrical insulation, and component protection in high-voltage environments. These coatings are intended to reduce the risk of thermal runaway, maintain optimal operating temperatures, and enable the use of lightweight materials in EV battery enclosures and cooling systems:

- ElectroHold Dielectric, which provides high dielectric strength (up to 42 kV/mm) while allowing thermal conductivity, enabling its use in battery housings, busbars, and power electronics.
- ElectroHold Flameproof, which offers short-term resistance to temperatures up to 1,400 °C and longer-term protection at lower temperatures, helping to delay or limit heat propagation in the event of a battery failure.
- ElectroHold EMC Shield, which is intended to reduce the effects of electromagnetic interference on sensitive electronic systems.

These coatings are compatible with various substrates, including aluminium, steel, and composite materials. Their application may support efforts to reduce vehicle weight without compromising functional or safety requirements.

These developments form part of the CeraBEV (Ceramics for Battery Electric Vehicles) project, a UK government-supported initiative led by Zircotec in collaboration with Cranfield University. The project aims to develop coatings that enable the wider use of lightweight materials while meeting the safety and performance requirements of EV battery and cooling system design. The project concluded in September 2025 after tests and simulations in partnership with Cranfield University and MIRA Ltd. showed significant performance increases compared to existing solutions.

== Applications ==
=== Motorsports ===
Zircotec works closely with motorsport teams from various categories, including Formula One, the British Touring Car Championship and NASCAR. Since 2018, Zircotec has maintained a technical partnership with Power Maxed Racing.

=== OEM and Tier 1 suppliers ===
- Aston Martin Valkyrie
- Aston Martin One-77
- Ducati Diavel Diesel
- Lamborghini Murciélago
- Koenigsegg CCX
- Pagani Zonda
- New Holland Low Carbon Gas Tractor

== Research and development ==
Zircotec undertakes research and development in collaboration with OEMs, universities, and publicly funded programmes, including the Advanced Propulsion Centre (APC) and Innovate UK. Its work focuses on thermal management for hydrogen engines, fuel cells, and electric vehicles, including coatings to reduce hydrogen embrittlement and support alternative-fuel applications.

Zircotec contributed ceramic coatings to APC-18 (Project Brunel), a collaboration with Cummins, Johnson Matthey, and PHINIA aimed at developing a 6.7-litre hydrogen-fuelled engine for commercial vehicles. The project demonstrated the potential for hydrogen combustion in heavy-duty applications.

Zircotec also leads CeraBEV, a £1 million project with Cranfield University to develop ceramic coatings combining dielectric insulation and flame resistance for use in battery electric vehicle enclosures and cooling systems.

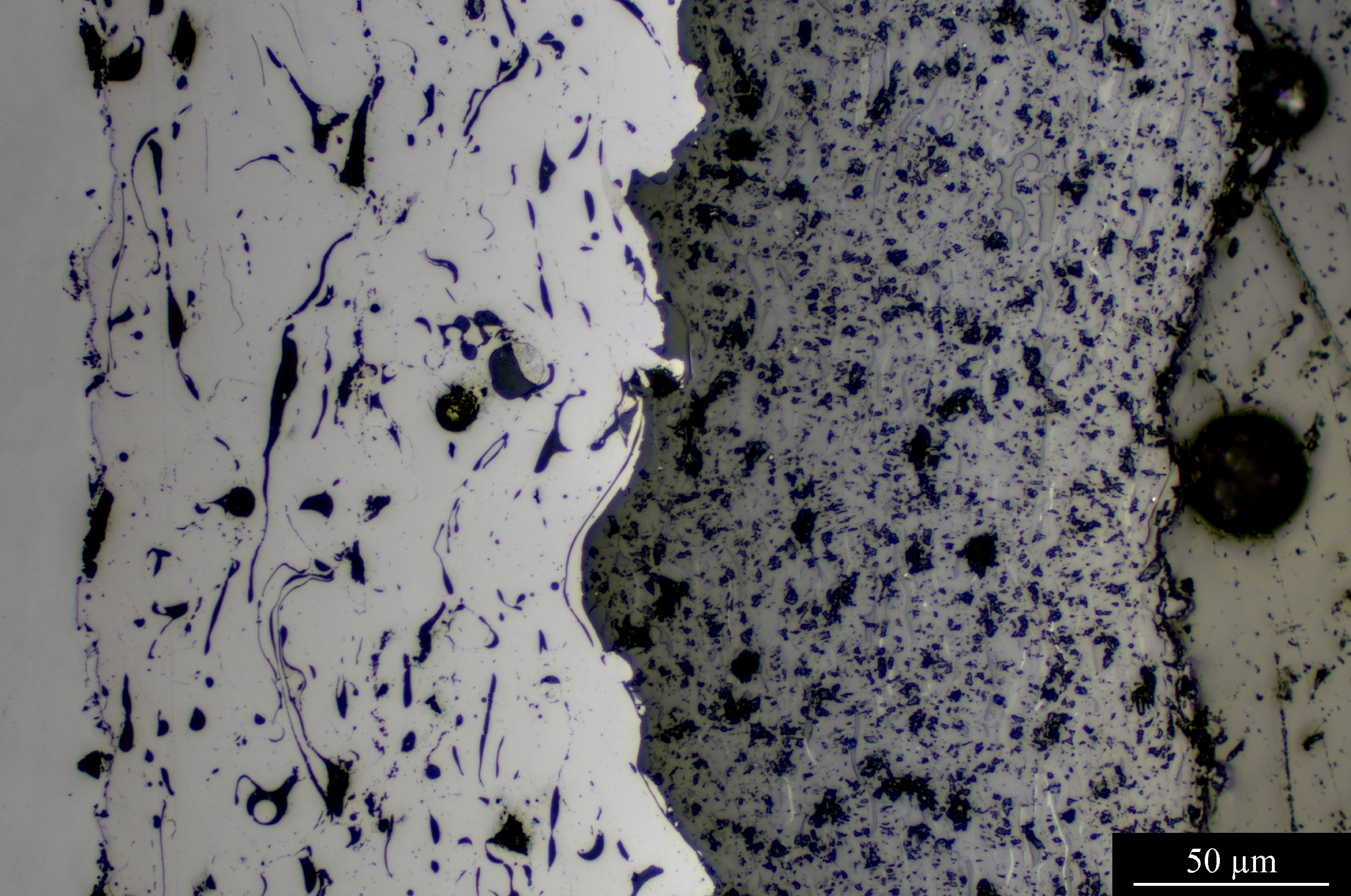
Plasma sprayed dual layer coating optical microscopy

The company operates a laboratory in Abingdon equipped for high-temperature testing, thermal imaging, microstructural analysis, and mechanical and dielectric testing. External partners support additional testing, including hydrogen permeation and electromagnetic interference (EMI) analysis. The lab supports product development and quality control, underpinned by a long-term archive of coating data.
